The following is a list of games either developed, published or licensed by Konami.

Arcade

1977–1989
 1977
Block Yard (released by Leijac)
 1978
Block Invader (released by Leijac)
Destroyer (released by Leijac)
Super Destroyer (released by Leijac)
Breaker (released by Leijac)
 1979
Car Chase (Head On clone, released by Leijac)
Astro Invader (Kamikaze in Japan, released by Leijac (JP) and Stern (NA))
Space King (Space Invaders clone, released by Leijac)
Space King 2 (Space Invaders Part II clone, released by Leijac)
Rich Man (Gee Bee clone, released by Leijac)
Space Ship (Star Fire clone, released by Leijac)
Space War (Intruder in North America, Space Laser in Europe, released by Leijac (JP), Game Plan (NA), and Taito (EU))
 1980
Maze  (released by Leijac)
 1981
Barian (released by Leijac)
The End (released by Leijac (JP) and Stern (NA))
Amidar (released by Leijac (JP) and Stern (NA))
Frogger (released by Sega)
Jungler (released by Stern (NA))
Scramble (released by Leijac (JP) and Stern (NA))
Strategy X
Super Cobra (released by Leijac (JP) and Stern (NA))
Tactician (released by Sega)
Turtles (released by Sega (JP) and Stern (NA))
Ultra Dome (possibly unreleased)
Video Hustler (also known as Lil' Hustler, released by Leijac (JP) and Dynamo (NA))
 1982
Locomotion (released by Centuri in North America)
Pooyan (released by Stern in North America)
Time Pilot (released by Centuri in North America)
Tutankham (released by Stern in North America)
 1983
Gyruss (released by Centuri in North America)
Juno First (released by Gottlieb in North America)
Mega Zone (released by Interlogic in North America)
Roc 'N Rope (released by Interlogic in North America)
Track & Field (Hyper Olympic outside North America, released by Centuri in North America)
Q-Bert (Japan; licensed from Gottlieb)
 1984
Badlands (released by Centuri in North America)
Circus Charlie (released by Centuri in North America)
Hyper Sports (Hyper Olympic '84 in Japan, released by Centuri in North America)
Mikie (released by Centuri in North America)
Pandora's Palace (released by Interlogic in North America)
Max Mile
Road Fighter
Super Basketball
Time Pilot '84
 1985
Finalizer
Galactic Warriors
Gradius (Nemesis outside Japan)
Konami GT
Konami's Ping Pong
Rush'n Attack (Green Beret in Japan and Europe)
Scooter Shooter
Shao-Lin's Road (Kicker in Europe)
Twinbee
Wiz Quiz
Yie Ar Kung Fu
 1986
Double Dribble
Mr. Goemon (aka Mr. Kabuki)
Vs. Gradius (on Nintendo's "Vs." hardware, released by Nintendo)
Iron Horse
Jackal aka Top Gunner
JailBreak
Rock'n Rage
Salamander / Life Force (US Version)
WEC Le Mans
Bass Angler
Vs. The Goonies (on Nintendo's "Vs." hardware, released by Nintendo)
 1987
Battlantis
B.A.W.
Black Panther
Blades of Steel
Boot Camp
Vs. Castlevania (on Nintendo's "Vs." hardware, released by Nintendo)
City Bomber
Combat School
Contra (Gryzor in Europe)
Dark Adventure
The Hustler
Devil World (not to be confused with Nintendo's Japan/PAL-only Famicom/NES game)
Fast Lane
Flak Attack
Hyper Crash
Labyrinth Runner
MX 5000
Rack 'Em Up
Life Force (Japanese Version)
Typhoon (Ajax)
 1988
Super Contra
Haunted Castle (Akumajō Dracula in Japan)
Chequered Flag (also known as Checkered Flag)
Devastators (Garuka in Japan)
The Main Event
The Final Round
Ajax
Thunder Cross
Kitten Kaboodle
Hot Chase
King of Rings
Gangbusters
Konami '88 (Hyper Sports Special in Japan; '88 Games in North America)
Gradius II (Vulcan Venture outside Japan)
VS. Top Gun (on Nintendo's "Vs." hardware)
 1989
Teenage Mutant Ninja Turtles
Gradius III
M.I.A.
Bottom of the Ninth
Crime Fighters
S. P. Y. - Special Project Y
Cue Brick
Block Hole

1990–1999
 1990
Aliens
Lightning Fighters
Punk Shot
Over Drive
Surprise Attack
Parodius Da!
Whoo Yarth Taar
 1991
Teenage Mutant Ninja Turtles: Turtles in Time
The Simpsons
Sunset Riders
Roller Games
Golfing Greats
Thunder Cross II
Vendetta
Detana!! Twinbee
Escape Kids
Xexex
Mario Roulette
Slime Kun
Tsurikko Penta
Pit-Fighter (Japan; licensed from Atari Games)
 1992
X-Men
Lethal Enforcers
G.I. Joe
Bucky O'Hare
Asterix
Hexion
Potrio
Wild West C.O.W.-Boys of Moo Mesa
 1993
Run'n Gun (Run and Gun)
F1 World Racing
Martial Champions
Metamorphic Force
Monster Maulers
Mystic Warriors
Violent Storm
Poly-Net Warriors (Polynet Warriors, multiplayer 3D polygon first-person shooter)
Polygonet Commanders
Premier Soccer
Gaiapolis
 1994
Brain Busters
Racing Force
Fantastic Journey
Lethal Enforcers II: Gunfighters
Quiz Do Re Mi Fa Grand Prix
Taisen Puzzle-dama
 1995
Dragoon Might
Midnight Run: Road Fighter 2
Crypt Killer
Pirate Ship
Road Rage (released as Speed King in Japan)
Five A Side Soccer
Ultra Sports
Premier Soccer '95
Quiz Do Re Mi Fa Grand Prix 2
Tokimeki Memorial Taisen Puzzle-Dama
Twin Bee Yahhoo!
Hole in One
 1996
Beat the Champ
Bishi Bashi Champ Mini Game Senshuken
Daisu-Kiss
Hyper Athlete
Konami's Open Golf Championship
Powerful Baseball '96
Run And Gun 2
Salamander 2
Sexy Parodius
Susume! Taisen Puzzle Dama
Taisen Tokkae dama
Vs. Net Soccer
Wave Shark
Winding Heat
GTI Club
Balloon Penta
Yu-Gi-Oh! Trading Card Game
 1997
Battle Vision
Beatmania
Dead Eye
Fighting Bujutsu
Hang Pilot
Operation Thunder Hurricane
Polystars
Racing Jam 
Rushing Heroes
Solar Assault
Solar Assault: Revised
Tokimeki Memorial Oshiete Your Heart
Total Vice
Wedding Rhapsody
Winning Spike
 1998
Battle Tryst
Beatmania 2ndMix
Beatmania 3rdMix
Beatstage
Dance Dance Revolution (Japanese release)
Dark Horse Legend
Evil Night
Fisherman's Bait Kit
Fisherman's Bait 2
Handle Champ
Heat Of Eleven '98
HipHopMania
Jikkyō Powerful Pro Baseball EX
Nagano Winter Olympics '98
NBA Play By Play
Pop'n Music
Racing Jam: Chapter 2 (Japanese release)
Rushing Heroes Football
Skiers' High
Super Bishi Bashi Champ
Teraburst
Thrill Drive
 1999
Beatmania 4thMix The Beat Goes On
Beatmania 5thMix Time to Get Down
Beatmania Complete Mix (HipHopMania Complete Mix in North America; Beatstage Complete Mix in Korea)
Beatmania IIDX
Beatmania IIDX 2nd Style
Beatmania IIDX Club Version
Beatmania IIDX Substream
Dance Dance Revolution (Asian release)
Dance Dance Revolution (North American release)
Dance Dance Revolution 2nd Mix
Dance Dance Revolution 2ndMix with Beatmania IIDX Club Version
Dance Dance Revolution 2ndMix Link Version
Dance Dance Revolution 2ndMix and Beatmania IIDX Substream Club Version
Dance Dance Revolution 3rdMix (Asian release)
Dance Dance Revolution 3rdMix (Japanese release)
Dance Dance Revolution Karaoke Mix
Dancing Stage (European version of Dance Dance Revolution)
Dancing Stage (re-release)
Dancing Stage EuroMix
Dancing Stage featuring Dreams Come True
Dancing Stage featuring True Kiss Destination (Asian release)
Dancing Stage featuring True Kiss Destination (Japanese release)
Dark Horse Legend 2
DrumMania
Fisherman's Bait Marlin Challenge
Gachaga Champ
Gradius IV
GuitarFreaks
GuitarFreaks 2ndMix
Hyper Bishi Bashi Champ
Pop'n Music 2
Pop'n Music 3
Pop'n Stage
Pop'n Stage EX
Silent Scope
Step Champ

2000–2009
 2000
Anime Champ
Beatmania ClubMix
Beatmania Complete Mix 2 (HipHopMania Complete Mix 2 in North America; Beatstage Complete Mix 2 in Korea)
Beatmania Core Remix
Beatmania Club Mix
Beatmania featuring Dreams Come True
Beatmania IIDX 3rd Style
Beatmania IIDX 4th Style
Beatmania III
Beatmania III Append Core Remix
Code One Dispatch
Dance Dance Revolution 3rdMix (Korean release)
Dance Dance Revolution 3rdMix (Korean re-release)
Dance Dance Revolution 3rdMix Plus
Dance Dance Revolution 4thMix (Japanese release)
Dance Dance Revolution 4thMix Plus (Asian release)
Dance Dance Revolution 4thMix Plus (Japanese release)
Dance Dance Revolution 4thMix (Asian release)
Dance Dance Revolution Karaoke Mix 2nd
Dance Dance Revolution Kids
Dance Dance Revolution USA
Dancing Stage featuring Disney's Rave
DanceManiax 1stMix
DanceManiax 2ndMix
DrumMania 2ndMix
DrumMania 3rdMix
GuitarFreaks 3rdMix
GuitarFreaks 4thMix
Keyboardmania (also known as Keyboard Heaven)
Keyboardmania 2ndMix
ParaParaParadise (also known as ParaParaDancing)
ParaParaParadise 1stMix Plus
Pop'n Music 4
Pop'n Music 5
Pop'n Music Animelo
Pop'n Music Mickey Tunes
Punch Mania: Hokuto No Ken (Fighting Mania outside Japan)
Silent Scope 2: Dark Silhouette (Innocent Sweeper in Japan; Fatal Judgement in other countries)
Simpsons Bowling
 2001
Beatmania 6thMix The UK Underground Music
Beatmania IIDX 5th Style
Beatmania IIDX 6th Style
Beatmania III Append 6th Mix
Boxing Mania: Ashita no Joe
Dance Dance Revolution 5thMix
DanceManiax 2ndMix Append JParadise
DDRMAX Dance Dance Revolution 6thMix
Driving Party
DrumMania 4thMix
DrumMania 5thMix
GTI Club 2
GuitarFreaks 5thMix
GuitarFreaks 6thMix
Gun Mania
Gun Mania Zone Plus
Jurassic Park III
Keyboardmania 3rdMix
Kick & Kick
Mambo a Go Go
Mocap Boxing
Monster Gate
Police 911 (America), The Keisatsukan (Japan & Asia), Police 24/7 (Europe)
Police 911 2 (America), The Keisatsukan 2 (Japan & Asia), Police 24/7 2 (Europe)
ParaParaParadise 2ndMix
Pop'n Music 6
Pop'n Music 7
Pop'n Music Animelo 2
Salary Man Champ
Silent Scope EXtreme (Sougeki [Japanese for sniper] in Japan)
Thrill Drive 2
Tsurugi: The Sword
 2002
Beatmania 7thMix Keepin' Evolution
Beatmania IIDX 7th Style
Beatmania IIDX 8th Style
Beatmania III Append 7th Mix
Beatmania III The Final
Beatmania The Final
Dance Dance Revolution Extreme
DDRMAX2 Dance Dance Revolution 7thMix
Dancing Stage EuroMix 2
Great Bishi Bashi Champ: Button Tatakisugi Keihō
Dog Station
Dog Station Deluxe
DrumMania 6thMix
DrumMania 7thMix
DrumMania 7thMIX power-up ver.
GuitarFreaks 7thMix
GuitarFreaks 8thMix
GuitarFreaks 8thMix power-up ver.
Mahjong Fight Club
Martial Beat
Mocap Golf
Monster Gate 2
Nice Smash!
Perfect Pool
Poolpocket
Pop'n Music 8
Pop'n Music 9
Silent Scope Fortune Hunter
Warring States
World Soccer Winning Eleven Arcade Game Style (Japan) / Pro Evolution Soccer The Arcade (World)
Xtrial Racing
 2003
Beatmania IIDX 9th Style
Beatmania III The Final
DrumMania 8thMix
DrumMania 9thMix
ee'mall
GuitarFreaks 9thMix
GuitarFreaks 10thMix
Mahjong Fight Club 2
Monster Gate 3
Pop'n Music 10
Quiz Magic Academy
R.P.M. Red
Thrill Drive 2
Warzaid
World Combat
World Soccer Winning Eleven Arcade Game Style 2003
 2004
Battle Climaxx!
Beatmania IIDX 10th Style
Beatmania IIDX 11 IIDXRED
DrumMania 10thMix
ee'mall 2nd Avenue
GuitarFreaks 11thMix
Lethal Enforcers 3
Mahjong Fight Club 3
Monster Gate Online
Pop'n Music 11
Pop'n Music 12 Iroha
Quiz Magic Academy 2
Thrill Drive 3 (Japanese release)
Wartran Troopers
 2005
Baseball Heroes
Battle Climaxx! 2
Beatmania IIDX 12: Happy Sky
Bishi Bashi Champ Online: Shōgeki no Zenkoku Taisen!?
Dance 86.4 Funky Radio Station
Dancing Stage Fusion
DrumMania V
DrumMania V2
Enthusia Professional Racing
Gashaaaan
GuitarFreaks V
GuitarFreaks V2
Mahjong Fight Club 4
Monster Gate Online 2
Paintball Mania
Pop'n Music 13 Carnival
Quiz Magic Academy 3
Toy's March
Toy's March 2
 2006
Baseball Heroes 2
Beatmania IIDX 13 Distorted
Cooper's9
Dance Dance Revolution SuperNova (Japanese release)
Dance Dance Revolution SuperNova (North American release)
Dance Dance Revolution SuperNova (North American re-release)
Dancing Stage SuperNova
Dancing Stage SuperNova (re-release)
DrumMania V3
GuitarFreaks V3
Mahjong Fight Club 5
Nova Usagi
Percussion Kids
Pop'n Music 14 Fever!
World Soccer Winning Eleven 2006 Arcade Championship (Japan) / Pro Evolution Soccer 2006 Arcade Championship (World)
YU GI OH GX spirit caller DS (Japanese release)
 2007

Baseball Heroes 3
Beatmania IIDX 14 Gold
Beatmania IIDX 15 DJ Troopers
Dance Dance Revolution SuperNova 2 (Japanese release)
DrumMania V4: Яock×Rock
GuitarFreaks V4: Яock×Rock
Mahjong Fight Club 6
Otomedius
Otona no Onnaryoku Kentei
Pop'n Music 15: Adventure
Quiz Magic Academy IV
Silent Hill: The Arcade
 2008
Action Deka
Baseball Heroes 2008: Seiha
beatmania IIDX 16 EMPRESS
Dance Dance Revolution SuperNova 2 (Asian release)
Dance Dance Revolution SuperNova 2 (North American release)
Dance Dance Revolution SuperNova 2 (South American release)
Dance Dance Revolution X (Asian release)
Dance Dance Revolution X (Japanese release)
DrumMania V5: Rock to Infinity
GuitarFreaks V5: Rock to Infinity
Mahjong Fight Club 7
Pop'n Music 16: Party
Quiz Magic Academy V
jubeat
World Soccer Winning Eleven Arcade Championship 2008
 2009
Baseball Heroes 2009: Hasha
beatmania IIDX 17 SIRIUS
THE Bishi Bashi
Dance Dance Revolution X (North American release)
Dance Dance Revolution X (European release)
DrumMania V6: Blazing!!!!
GuitarFreaks V6: Blazing!!!!
Mahjong Fight Club 7.77
Mahjong Fight Club Garyō Tensei
Pop'n Music 17: The Movie
Quiz Magic Academy VI
Quiz Magic Academy VI Extra
jubeat ripples

2010–2019
 2010
Baseball Heroes 2010: Winner
beatmania IIDX 18: Resort Anthem
Dance Dance Revolution X2 (Asian release)
Dance Dance Revolution X2 (Japanese release)
Dance Dance Revolution X2 (U.S. release)
DrumMania V7
DrumMania XG&GuitarFreaks XG
GuitarFreaks V7
jubeat knit
Mahjong Fight Club Ultimate Version
pop'n music 18: Sengoku Retsuden
pop'n music 19: Tune Street
Quiz Magic Academy VII
World Soccer Winning Eleven Arcade Championship 2010
Metal Gear Arcade
 2011
Baseball Heroes 2011: Shine Star
beatmania IIDX 19: Lincle
Dance Dance Revolution X3 (Japanese release)
DrumMania V8
DrumMania XG2&GuitarFreaks XG2
GuitarFreaks V8
Hello! pop'n music
jubeat copious
jubeat knit APPEND
Mahjong Fight Club u.v.: Kizuna no Shō
pop'n music 20: fantasia
Quiz Magic Academy VIII
Steel Chronicle
World Soccer Winning Eleven Arcade Championship 2012
 2012
Baseball Heroes 2012
beatmania IIDX 20: Tricoro
Dance Evolution Arcade
GuitarFreaks XG3&DrumMania XG3
Mahjong Fight Club NEXT
pop'n music: Sunny Park
Quiz Magic Academy: Kenja no Tobira
Sound Voltex Booth
Steel Chronicle Be
 2013
Baseball Heroes 2013
beatmania IIDX 21 SPADA
Dance Dance Revolution (2013 edition) (Japanese release)
Dance Dance Revolution (2013 edition) (Asian release)
GITADORA
Mahjong Fight Club: Itadaki no Zin
Mirai ga Gakki: Future Tom Tom
Quiz Magic Academy: Kenja no Tobira Season 2
SOUND VOLTEX II -infinite infection-
Steel Chronicle Be XROSS ARMS
Steel Chronicle Victroopers
World Soccer Winning Eleven Arcade Championship 2014
 2014
Baseball Heroes 2014
beatmania IIDX 22 PENDUAL
BeatStream
Dance Dance Revolution (2014 edition)
GITADORA OverDrive
Mahjong Fight Club: Sai no Hana
pop'n music: Lapistoria
Quiz Magic Academy: Ten no Manabiya
SCOTTO
SOUND VOLTEX III -GRAVITY WARS-
Silent Scope: Bone Eater
 2015
BeatStream AnimTribe
Otoca D'or
Quiz Magic Academy: Akatsuki no Kane
MÚSECA
pop'n music éclale
Disney Tsum Tsum (Arcade)
Jubeat Prop
Reflec Beat Volzza
Beatmania IIDX 23: copula
Monster Strike MULTI BURST
GITADORA Tri-Boost
 2016
Mahjong Fight Club Zero
GI-VICTORY ROAD
MÚSECA 1+1/2
Jubeat Qubell
Reflec Beat Volzza 2
Reflec Beat: The Reflesia of Eternity
Dance Dance Revolution A
Quiz Magic Academy: Tokyo Grimoire
beatmania IIDX 24: SINOBUZ
SOUND VOLTEX IV HEAVENLY HAVEN
pop'n music: Usagi to Neko to Shōnen no Yume
GITADORA Tri-Boost Re:EVOLVE
 2017
Nostalgia
Mahjong Fight Club: Gōka Kenran
Quiz Magic Academy: THE WORLD EVOLVE
jubeat Clan
Nostalgia FORTE
GITADORA Matixx
 2018
Baseball Collection
beatmania IIDX 25: Cannon Ballers
Bishi Bashi Channel
DANCERUSH Stardom
Quiz Magic Academy: MAXIVCORD
beatmania IIDX 26: Rootage
Mahjong Fight Club: Grand Master
Nostalgia Op.2
Bombergirl
jubeat festo
pop'n music peace
GITADORA EXCHAIN
2019
Baseball Collection Season 2019
Sound Voltex: Vivid Wave
Dance Dance Revolution A20
Quiz Magic Academy: Kiseki no Kōsa -Xross Voyage-
beatmania IIDX 27: Heroic Verse
Nostalgia Op.3
GITADORA NEX+AGE
beatmania IIDX LIGHTNING MODEL

2020-Present 
2020
Baseball Collection Season 2020
Quiz Magic Academy: Kibou no Toki
Mahjong Fight Club: Jifēng
Dance Dance Revolution A20 PLUS
beatmania IIDX 28: Bistrover
Busou Shinki: Armored Princess Battle Conductor
NEW pop'n music Welcome to Wonderland！

2021
Sound Voltex VALKYRIE MODEL
Sound Voltex Exceed Gear
Baseball Collection Season 2021
beatmania IIDX 29: CastHour
Quiz Magic Academy: Mugen no kagami-kai

2022
beatmania IIDX 30: RESIDENT
jubeat Ave.

3DO
 1995
Policenauts Pilot Disk
Policenauts

MSX
 1983
Antarctic Adventure 
Monkey Academy  (also released by Philips as VG 8102)
Time Pilot 
Frogger 
Super Cobra 
Konami's Billiards (also known as Video Hustler and also released by Sony as HBS-G008C) 
Sparkie (released by Sony) 
Juno First (released by Sony) 
Crazy Train (released by Sony) 
 1984
Athletic Land 
Konami's Mahjong 
Hyper Olympic 1 (also known as Track & Field 1 and also released by Sony as HBS-G010C ) 
Hyper Olympic 2 (also known as Track & Field 2 and also released by Sony as HBS-G011C) 
Circus Charlie (also released by Casio as GPM-105) 
Magical Tree 
Comic Bakery 
Hyper Sports 1 
Cabbage Patch Kids 
Hyper Sports 2 (also released by Sony as HBS-G012C) 
Sky Jaguar 
Konami's Pinball (never released) 
Badlands (LaserDisc game) 
Road Fighter  (also released by Casio as GPM-116) 
 1985
Hyper Rally 
Konami's Tennis (also released by Casio as GPM-106) 
Konami's Golf 
Konami's Baseball 
Yie-Ar Kung Fu (also released by Casio as GPM-108) 
King's Valley (also released by Casio as GPM-110) 
Mopi Ranger (also released by Casio as GPM-111) 
Pippols 
Konami's Ping Pong 
Konami's Soccer 
Hyper Sports 3 
Game Master 
Konami's Boxing 
Yie-Ar Kung Fu 2  (also released by Casio as GPM-121) 
Pooyan (released by Hudson as a Bee Card) 
 Japanese Word Processor unit 
 1986
The Goonies 
Knightmare (also released by Casio as GPM-122) 
TwinBee (also released by MagaCom as SN-215 and Casio as GPM-127) 
Konami's Synthesizer 
Gradius (also known as Nemesis in Europe) 
Penguin Adventure 
Q*Bert 
Green Beret (the only game by Konami UK)
 1987
The Maze of Galious 
Gradius 2 (also known as Nemesis 2 in Europe) 
F1 Spirit 
Shalom 
The Game Master 2 
Salamander (also released by MagaCom as SN-906)
 1988
Parodius 
King's Valley II 
Gofer no Yabō Episode II (released as Nemesis 3: The Eve of Destruction in Europe) 
Konami Game Collection 1 (Knightmare, Antarctic Adventure, Yie-Ar Kung Fu, Yie-Ar Kung Fu 2, King's Valley) 
Konami Game Collection 2 (Boxing, Tennis, Video Hustler, Hyper Olympic 1, Hyper Sports 2) 
Konami Game Collection 3 (TwinBee, Super Cobra, Sky Jaguar, Time Pilot, Nemesis) 
Konami Game Collection 4 (Soccer, Ping-Pong, Golf, Hyper Olympic 2, Hyper Sports 3) 
 1989
Konami Game Collection Extra 
 1990
Teenage Mutant Hero Turtles

MSX2
 1986
Akumajō Dracula (called Vampire Killer in Europe) 
King Kong 2: Yomigaeru Densetsu 
 1987
Ganbare Goemon
Hi no Tori
Metal Gear 
The Treasure of Uşas
 1988
King's Valley II 
The Pro Yakyū: Gekitotsu; Pennant Race 
Konami's Uranai Sensation 
Snatcher 
Break Shot (never released)
 1989
Contra 
Konami Game Collection Extra (Pippols, Hyper Rally, Road Fighter, Tsururin Kun, Hyper Somen, Title Awase, Go Board) 
The Pro Yakyū: Gekitotsu; Pennant Race 2 
Hai no Majutsushi (also known as Mah-Jong 2) 
Space Manbow 
Tentochito (never released, not confirmed) 
 1990
Metal Gear 2: Solid Snake 
Quarth 
SD Snatcher

MSX2+
 1988
F1 Spirit 3D Special (two MSX2+ computers could be linked with a multiplayer link cable)

PC
 1988
Contra/Gryzor
Top Gunner
 1989
Bloodwych
Boot Camp
Rush'n Attack
Teenage Mutant Ninja Turtles/Teenage Mutant Hero Turtles
 1990
Bill Elliott's NASCAR Challenge
Blades of Steel
Castlevania
Double Dribble
Metal Gear
Predator 2
Super C
Theme Park Mystery
 1991
J.R.R. Tolkien's Riders of Rohan
Killing Cloud
Mission: Impossible
Spacewrecked: 14 Billion Light Years From Earth
The Simpsons: Arcade Game
The Simpsons: Bart's House of Weirdness
Teenage Mutant Ninja Turtles: The Arcade Game/Teenage Mutant Hero Turtles: The Coin-Op!
Teenage Mutant Ninja Turtles: Manhattan Missions
Top Gun: Danger Zone
 1992
Batman Returns
NFL
Plan 9 from Outer Space
 1993
Frontier: Elite 2
NFL Video Pro Football
 1996
Eisei Meijin for Windows 95
Kirameki Houseki Bako: Tokimeki Memorial Screen Saver Vol. 1
Ukiuki Bento Bako: Tokimeki Memorial Screen Saver Vol. 2
Tokimeki Memorial Taisen: Puzzle Dama
 1997
Gradius Deluxe Pack
Jikkyō Powerful Pro Yakyū '96
Henry Explorers
Rakugaki Enogu Bako: Tokimeki Memorial Screen Saver Vol. 3
Dokidoki Bikkuri Hako: Tokimeki Memorial Screen Saver Vol. 4
Tokimeki Memorial: Forever With You
Polyco Gal
Frontier Brain
 1998
Vandal Hearts
TwinBee PARADISE in Donburi Shima
Genso Suikoden
Tokimeki Memorial: Oshiete Your Heart
Mahjong Master
 2000
Metal Gear Solid: Integral
The Grinch
The Mummy
Woody Woodpecker Racing
 2001
Dancing Karaoke DKara
 2002
Dance Dance Revolution
ESPN NFL PrimeTime 2002
Frogger: The Great Quest
Konami Collector's Series: Castlevania & Contra
Shadow of Destiny
Silent Hill 2: Director's Cut
Tokimeki Memorial Typing
Whiteout
 2003
Apocalyptica
Bomberman Collection
Casino, Inc.
Frogger Beyond
Frogger's Adventures: The Rescue
Genso Suikoden II
International Superstar Soccer 3
Metal Gear Solid 2: Substance
Pro Evolution Soccer 3
Silent Hill 3
Teenage Mutant Ninja Turtles
Tokimeki Memorial 2 Typing
Yu-Gi-Oh! Power of Chaos: Yugi the Destiny
 2004
Pro Evolution Soccer 4
Silent Hill 4: The Room
Teenage Mutant Ninja Turtles 2: Battle Nexus
Tokimeki Memorial Girl's Side 1st Love Typing
Yu-Gi-Oh! Power of Chaos: Kaiba the Revenge
Yu-Gi-Oh! Power of Chaos: Joey the Passion
 2005
Crime Life: Gang Wars
Pro Evolution Soccer 5
Teenage Mutant Ninja Turtles: Mutant Melee
Yu-Gi-Oh! Online
Tokimeki Factory Vol.1: Tokimeki Memorial Girl's Side
Tokimeki Factory Vol.2: Tokimeki Memorial Girl's Side
 2006
Busou Shinki DIORAMA STUDIO
Pro Evolution Soccer 6
The Regiment
Winx Club
Tokimeki Factory: Tokimeki Memorial 2
 2007
Busou Shinki BATTLE RONDO
Marvel Trading Card Game
Tokimeki Memorial Girl's Side 2nd Kiss Typing
Pro Evolution Soccer 2008
Yu-Gi-Oh! Online Duel Evolution
 2008
Pro Evolution Soccer 2009
Silent Hill: Homecoming
 2009
Pro Evolution Soccer 2010
Saw: The Videogame 
 2010
Pro Evolution Soccer 2011
 2011
Pro Evolution Soccer 2012
 2012
Pro Evolution Soccer 2013
 2013
Castlevania: Lords of Shadow
Pro Evolution Soccer 2014
The Snowman and the Snowdog
 2014
Metal Gear Rising: Revengeance
Castlevania: Lords of Shadow 2
Pro Evolution Soccer 2015
Metal Gear Solid V: Ground Zeroes
 2015
Metal Gear Solid V: The Phantom Pain
Pro Evolution Soccer 2016
 2016
Pro Evolution Soccer 2017
Yu-Gi-Oh! Legacy of the Duelist
 2017
SOUNDVOLTEX III: Gravity Wars e-Amusement Cloud
Pro Evolution Soccer 2018 (Europe, Australia & North America) / Winning Eleven 2018 (Japan & Asia)
 2018
Metal Gear Survive
Pro Evolution Soccer 2019 (Europe, Australia & North America) / Winning Eleven 2019 (Japan & Asia)
Super Bomberman R
Zone of the Enders: The 2nd Runner MARS (Europe, Australia & North America) / Anubis: Zone of The Enders MARS (Japan & Asia)
 2019
Arcade Classics Anniversary Collection
Castlevania Anniversary Collection
Contra Anniversary Collection
Contra: Rogue Corps
eFootball PES 2020 (Europe, Australia & North America) / eFootball Winning Eleven 2020 (Japan & Asia)
 2020
Skelattack
eFootball PES 2021 Season Update (Europe, Australia & North America) / eFootball Winning Eleven 2021 Season Update (Japan & Asia)
 2021
Getsu Fūma Den: Undying Moon
Crimesight
CYGNI: All Guns Blazing
Yu-Gi-Oh! Master Duel

EGG
Parodius
Gradius
Salamander
Detana!! TwinBee
Penguin Adventure

PC-8801
 1986
Gradius
The Goonies
 1988
Snatcher
 1990
Ten to Chi to
 Cancelled
Majou Densetsu II: Poporon Gekitou Hen

Picno
 Save Card
 Montage
 Fushigi no kuni no Alice
 Picno de ABC
 Anime enikki
 Picno de AIUEO
 Picno de 123
 Picno Art Puzzle
 Real Montage
 Kīroi Kyōryū-kun Parasa no Obake Taiji
 Dokkin Shinri Game
 Picno de kuku
 Shira Yuki Hime Monogatari
 Nontan to issho anime stamp
 Manfī no fushigina bōken
 Son Gokū no Bōken
 Sen'yō Card Soft

PC-9801
1989
Dennou Shougi

PC-9821
 1994
Policenauts

Famicom / NES
 1985
Antarctic Adventure
Yie Ar Kung-Fu
Track & Field
Road Fighter
 1986
TwinBee
The Goonies
Circus Charlie
Gradius
Ganbare Goemon: Karakuri Douchuu
  Castlevania
  Stinger
 Crackout
King Kong 2: Ikari no Megaton Punch
 1987
Hi no Tori Hououhen: Gaou no Bouken
Esper Dream
The Goonies II
Rush'n Attack
Ai Senshi Nicol
Meikyuu Jiin Dababa
Smash Ping Pong
Exciting Billiard
Getsu Fūma Den
Double Dribble
Majō Densetsu II: The Maze of Galious
Arumana no Kiseki
Castlevania II: Simon's Quest
Life Force
Falsion
Dragon Scroll
Doremikko
Exciting Baseball
Top Gun
Exciting Boxing
Metal Gear
 1988
Konami Wai Wai World
Contra
Exciting Soccer: Konami Cup
Konami Hyper Soccer
Tetsuwan Atom
Bio Miracle Bokutte Upa
Jackal
Risa no Yōsei Densetsu
Jarinko Chie
Blades of Steel
The Adventures of Bayou Billy
Konamic Tennis
Gyruss
Gradius II
Skate or Die!
 1989
Ganbare Goemon 2
Motocross Champion
Ganbare Pennant Race
 Q*Bert (US version)
Teenage Mutant Ninja Turtles
Defender of the Crown (developed by Beam Software)
Cosmic Wars
Racer Mini Yonku: Japan Cup
Track & Field II
TwinBee 3: Poko Poko Daimaō
Top Gun: The Second Mission
Castlevania III: Dracula's Curse
Silent Service (developed by Rare)
NHK Gakuen - Space School - Sansu 4 Nen (Ge)
NHK Gakuen - Space School - Sansu 4 Nen (Jou)
NHK Gakuen - Space School - Sansu 5 Nen (Ge)
NHK Gakuen - Space School - Sansu 5 Nen (Jou)
NHK Gakuen - Space School - Sansu 6 Nen (Ge):
NHK Gakuen - Space School - Sansu 6 Nen (Jou)
 1990
Ganbare Goemon Gaiden: Kieta Ōgon Kiseru
Kings of the Beach
Super C
Moai-kun
Mōryō Senki MADARA
Jack Nicklaus' Greatest 18 Holes of Major Championship Golf
Quarth
Snake's Revenge
Mission: Impossible
RollerGames
Akumajō Special: Boku Dracula-kun
Parodius
Teenage Mutant Ninja Turtles II: The Arcade Game
Idemitsu - Space College - Kikenbutsu no Yasashii Butsuri to Kagaku 
 1991
Wai Wai World 2: SOS!! Parsley Jō
Yume Penguin Monogatari
Ski or Die
Laser Invasion
Lagrange Point
Base Wars
Crisis Force
The Lone Ranger
Where in Time Is Carmen Sandiego? (developed by Distinctive Software)
Pirates! (developed by Rare)
Rampart (Japan version)
Teenage Mutant Ninja Turtles III: The Manhattan Project
Tiny Toon Adventures
Bill Elliott's NASCAR Challenge (developed by Distinctive Software)
 1992
Ganbare Goemon Gaiden 2: Tenka no Zaihō
Bucky O'Hare
Monster in My Pocket
Nightshade (developed by Beam Software)
Star Trek 25th Anniversary (developed by Interplay)
Esper Dream 2
King's Quest V: Absence Makes the Heart Go Yonder! (developed by Novotrade)
Contra Force
Tiny Toon Adventures 2: Trouble in Wackyland
Tiny Toon Adventures Cartoon Workshop (developed by Novotrade)
Noah's Ark (developed by Source Research & Development)
 1993
Formula 1 Sensation
Batman Returns
Zen Intergalactic Ninja
Rackets & Rivals
Nigel Mansell's World Championship Racing (Published in Europe by Konami) (Developed by Gremlin Graphics Software)
 1994
Teenage Mutant Ninja Turtles: Tournament Fighters

Super Famicom / Super NES
1990
Gradius III
 1991
The Legend of the Mystical Ninja
Super Castlevania IV
 1992
Axelay
Contra III: The Alien Wars
Cybernator (Assault Suits Valken in Japan) (Developed by Masaya)
Parodius Da! －Shinwa kara Owarai e－
Prince of Persia (Developed by Masaya)
Teenage Mutant Ninja Turtles IV: Turtles in Time
Tiny Toon Adventures: Buster Busts Loose
 1993
Batman Returns
Ganbare Goemon 2
Mōryō Senki MADARA 2
NFL Football (Developed by Park Place Productions)
Pop'n Twinbee
Sunset Riders
Teenage Mutant Ninja Turtles: Tournament Fighters
Zombies Ate My Neighbors (Developed by LucasArts)
 1994
The Adventures of Batman & Robin
Animaniacs
Biker Mice From Mars
Ganbare Goemon 3
Gokujō Parodius! ～Kako no Eikō o Motomete～
International Superstar Soccer
Jikkyō Powerful Pro Yakyū '94
Twinbee: Rainbow Bell Adventures
Sparkster
Shin Mahjong
Tiny Toon Adventures: Wacky Sports Challenge
Tsuyoshi Shikkari Shinasai: Taisen Puzzle-dama
 1995
Castlevania: Dracula X
Chibi Maruko-chan: Mezase! Minami no Island!!
Ganbare Goemon 4
International Superstar Soccer Deluxe
Jikkyō Oshaberi Parodius
Jikkyō Powerful Pro Yakyū 2
Metal Warriors (USA only) (Developed by LucasArts)
NBA Give 'n Go
 1996
Jikkyō Power Pro Wrestling '96: Max Voltage
Jikkyō Powerful Pro Yakyū '96 Kaimaku-ban
Jikkyō Powerful Pro Yakyū 3
Tokimeki Memorial
Jikkyō Keiba Simulation: Stable Star
Soreyuke Ebisumaru Karakuri Meiro - Kieta Goemon no Nazo
 1997
Jikkyō Powerful Pro Yakyū 3 '97 Haru
 1998
Jikkyō Powerful Pro Yakyū: Basic-ban '98

Nintendo 64
 1996
Jikkyō J. League Perfect Striker
 1997
International Superstar Soccer 64
Jikkyō Powerful Pro Yakyū 4
Mystical Ninja Starring Goemon
 1998
Castlevania 64
Deadly Arts
International Superstar Soccer '98
NBA In The Zone '98
Susume! Taisen Puzzle Dama: Tōkon! Marutama Chō
Jikkyō Powerful Pro Yakyū 5
Nagano Winter Olympics '98
Holy Magic Century (a.k.a. Quest 64)
NHL Blades of Steel '99
Rakugakids
Goemon's Great Adventure
 1999
Castlevania: Legacy of Darkness
Bottom of the 9th
Hybrid Heaven
Jikkyō Powerful Pro Yakyū 6
Jikkyō GI Stable
Goemon Mononoke Sugoroku
International Superstar Soccer 2000
 2000
NBA In The Zone 2000
Jikkyō Powerful Pro Yakyū 2000
Dance Dance Revolution Disney's World Dancing Museum
 2001
Jikkyō Powerful Pro Yakyū Basic-ban 2001

GameCube
 2002
Winning Eleven 6: Final Evolution
Captain Tsubasa: Golden Generation Challenge
Disney Sports Football
Frogger Beyond
Disney Sports Skateboarding
ESPN International Winter Sports 2002
ESPN MLS ExtraTime 2002
Evolution Skateboarding
Hyper Sports Winter 2002
International Superstar Soccer 2
Jikkyo Powerful Pro Yakyū 9
Jikkyo World Soccer 2002
Muscle Champion: Kinnikutou Kessen
WTA Tour Tennis
 2003
Crash Bandicoot: The Wrath of Cortex (distributed by Konami)
Teenage Mutant Ninja Turtles
Disney Sports Basketball
Frogger's Adventures: The Rescue
Yu-Gi-Oh! The Falsebound Kingdom
DreamMix TV World Fighters
Evolution Snowboarding
Hikaru no Go
Hikaru no Go 3
International Superstar Soccer 3
Jikkyo Powerful Pro Yakyū 10
Jikkyo Powerful Pro Yakyū 10 Chō Kettei-ban
The Baseball 2003: Battle Ballpark Sengen Perfect Play Pro Yakyū
 2004
Metal Gear Solid: The Twin Snakes
Teenage Mutant Ninja Turtles 2: Battle Nexus
King Arthur
Crash Nitro Kart (distributed by Konami)
Jikkyo Powerful Pro Yakyū 11
Jikkyo Powerful Pro Yakyū 11 Chō Kettei-ban
 2005
Dance Dance Revolution Mario Mix (Japan)
Dance Dance Revolution Mario Mix (North America)
Dancing Stage Mario Mix (Europe)
Dancing Stage Mario Mix (Australia)
TMNT: Mutant Melee
Teenage Mutant Ninja Turtles 3: Mutant Nightmare
Karaoke Revolution Party
Frogger: Ancient Shadow
Jikkyo Powerful Pro Yakyū 12
Jikkyo Powerful Pro Yakyū 12 Chō Kettei-ban
Rave Master
 2006
Jikkyō Powerful Major League
 2007
Korokke! Pan Ou no Kiki wo Sukue (cancelled)
Street Kings

Wii
 2006
Elebits
 2007
Dance Dance Revolution Hottest Party
Dewy's Adventure
Jikkyō Powerful Pro Yakyū Wii
Jikkyō Powerful Major League 2 (Japan) / MLB Power Pros (North America)
 2008
Castlevania Judgement
Dance Dance Revolution Hottest Party 2
Death Jr. II: Root of Evil
Jikkyō Powerful Pro Yakyū 15
Jikkyō Powerful Major League 3 (Japan) / MLB Power Pros 2008 (North America)
Lost in Blue: Shipwrecked
Pro Evolution Soccer 2008
Gradius Rebirth
Critter Round-Up
 Guinness World Records: The Video Game
 2009
Jikkyō Powerful Pro Yakyū NEXT
Jikkyō Powerful Major League 2009
Pro Evolution Soccer 2009
Silent Hill: Shattered Memories
Scene It? Twilight
Castlevania: The Adventure ReBirth
Tomena Sanner
Sandy Beach
Driift Mania
Pop'n Music Wii
Contra ReBirth
Ant Nation
Dance Dance Revolution Hottest Party 3
Dance Dance Revolution Winx Club
Tornado Outbreak
Yu-Gi-Oh! 5D's Whellie Breakers
 2010
Pro Evolution Soccer 2010
Def Jam Rapstar
Ben 10 Alien Force: The Rise of Hex
Yard Sale Hidden Treasures: Sunnyville
Dance Dance Revolution
Gormiti: The Lords of Nature!
Yu-Gi-Oh! 5D's: Master of the Cards (Japan) / Yu-Gi-Oh! 5D's: Duel Transer (North America & Europe)
 2011
Dance Dance Revolution II
Ra.One (Europe only)

Virtual Console
 Super Castlevania IV
 Contra III: The Alien Wars
 Gradius
 Teenage Mutant Ninja Turtles
 Road Fighter
 Gradius III
 Castlevania
 The Legend of the Mystical Ninja
 Gradius II: Ambition of Gofer
 Konami's Ping Pong
 Antarctic Adventure
 Salamander
 Detana! Twinbee
 Super C
 Esper Dream
 Axelay
 Cybernator
 Castlevania II: Simon's Quest
 Ganbare Goemon! Karakuri Dōchū
 Getsu Fūma Den
 Double Dribble
 Parodius
 Space Manbow
 Bio Miracle Bokutte Upa
 Ganbare Goemon 3: Shichijuurokubei no Karakuri Manji Gatame
 Ganbare Goemon Gaiden: Kieta Ōgon Kiseru
 Castlevania: Rondo of Blood

Wii U

Virtual Console
 Parodius
 Space Manbow
 Super Castlevania IV
 Contra III: The Alien Wars
 Gradius
 The Legend of the Mystical Ninja
 Penguin Adventure

Sega Mega Drive/Genesis
 1992
Sunset Riders
Teenage Mutant Ninja Turtles: The Hyperstone Heist
 1993
Lethal Enforcers
Rocket Knight Adventures
Teenage Mutant Ninja Turtles: Tournament Fighters
Tiny Toon Adventures: Buster's Hidden Treasure
Zombies Ate My Neighbors (Developed by LucasArts)
 1994
Animaniacs
Castlevania: Bloodlines
Contra: Hard Corps
Double Dribble: The Playoff Edition
Lethal Enforcers II: Gunfighters
Nigel Mansell's World Championship Racing (Published in Europe by Konami) (Developed by Gremlin Graphics Software)
Sparkster: Rocket Knight Adventures 2
Tiny Toon Adventures: ACME All-Stars
 1996
International Superstar Soccer Deluxe

Sega Mega-CD
 1993
Lethal Enforcers
 1994
Lethal Enforcers II: Gunfighters
Snatcher

Sega Saturn
 1995
Chibi Maruko-Chan: No Taisen Puzzle Dama
Detana Twinbee Yahho! Deluxe Pack
Eisei Meijin
Gokujō Parodius Da! Deluxe Pack
Jikkyō Powerful Pro Yakyū '95
 1996
Bottom of the 9th
Eisei Meijin II
Gradius Deluxe Pack
Jikkyō Oshaberi Parodius: Forever with Me
Policenauts
Sexy Parodius
Snatcher
Tokimeki Memorial: Forever With You
Tokimeki Memorial Taisen: Puzzle Dama
 1997
Contra: Legacy of War
Crypt Killer
Jikkyō Powerful Pro Yakyū S
Salamander Deluxe Pack Plus
Tokimeki Memorial Drama Series Vol. 1: Nijiiro no Seishun
Tokimeki Memorial Selection: Fujisaki Shiori
Tokimeki Memorial Taisen: Tokkae Dama
Vandal Hearts
Whizz
 1998
Akumajō Dracula X: Gekka no Yasōkyoku (Castlevania: Symphony of the Night)
Genso Suikoden
J-League Jikkyō Honoo no Striker
Konami Antiques MSX Collection Ultra Pack
Tokimeki Memorial Drama Series Vol. 2: Irodori no Love Song
Yoshimura Shogi
 1999
Tokimeki Memorial Drama Series Vol. 3: Tabidachi no Uta

Dreamcast
 1999
Airforce Delta (Japan & North America) / Deadly Skies (Europe)
Dancing Blade: Katte ni Momo Tenshi
Dancing Blade: Katte ni Momo Tenshi II - Tears Of Eden
Eisei Meijin III
Pop'n Music
Pop'n Music 2
 2000
Dance Dance Revolution 2ndMix
Dance Dance Revolution Club Version Dreamcast Edition
ESPN International Track & Field
ESPN NBA 2Night
Jikkyō Powerful Pro Yakyū Dreamcast Edition
Nightmare Creatures II
Pop'n Music 3 Append Disc
Pop'n Music 4 Append Disc
Silent Scope
The Grinch

PlayStation
 1994
Gokujō Parodius Da! Deluxe Pack
Jikkyō Powerful Pro Yakyū '95
TwinBee Taisen Puzzle Dama
 1995
Detana TwinBee Yahho! Deluxe Pack
Eisei Meijin
J-League Winning Eleven
NBA In The Zone
Suikoden
Tokimeki Memorial: Forever With You
 1996
Bottom of the 9th
Contra: Legacy of War
Eisei Meijin II
The Final Round
Ganbare Goemon: Uchū Kaizoku Akogingu
Goal Storm
Gradius Deluxe Pack
International Track & Field
J-League Jikkyō Winning Eleven 97
Jikkyō Oshaberi Parodius: Forever with Me
Konami Open Golf
Lightning Legend
NFL Full Contact
Pachinko Dream
Policenauts
Policenauts Private Collection
Project Overkill
Sexy Parodius
Snatcher
Road Rage/Speed King
Susume! Taisen Puzzle Dama
Tokimeki Memorial Private Collection
Tokimeki Memorial Taisen Puzzle-Dama
Vandal Hearts
 1997
Bottom of the 9th '97
Breeding Stud: Bokujou de Aimashou
Broken Helix
Castlevania: Symphony of the Night
Crypt Killer
Goal Storm '97
Gradius Gaiden
International Super Star Soccer Pro
Konami Antiques MSX Collection Vol. 1
Lethal Enforcers I & II
Midnight Run
Nagano Winter Olympics '98
Paro Wars
Poy Poy
Salamander Deluxe Pack Plus
Tokimeki Memorial Drama Series Vol. 1: Nijiiro no Seishun
Tokimeki Memorial Selection: Fujisaki Shiori
Tokimeki Memorial Taisen Tokkae Dama
 1998
Azure Dreams
Bishi Bashi Special
Bottom of the 9th '99
Breeding Stud 2
The Contra Adventure (North America only)
Dancing Blade Katteni Momotenshi!
Diver's Dream
Fisherman's Bait: A Bass Challenge
Ganbare Goemon: Kuru Nara Koi! Ayashige Ikka no Kuroi Kage
G.A.S.P!! Fighters' NEXTream
Hellnight
International Superstar Soccer '98
Kensei: Sacred Fist
Konami Antiques MSX Collection Vol. 2
Konami Antiques MSX Collection Vol. 3
Metal Gear Solid
Mitsumete Knight
Mitsumete Knight R Daibouken hen
Nagano Winter Olympics '98
NBA In The Zone '98
Poy Poy 2
Suikoden II
Tokimeki Memorial Drama Series Vol. 2 Irodori no Love Song
Tokimeki no Houkago
TwinBee RPG
beatmania
beatmania APPEND 3rdMIX mini
beatmania APPEND 3rdMIX
Magical Medical
Yu-Gi-Oh! Monster Capsule: Breed & Battle
 1999
Bishi Bashi Special 2
Breeding Stud '99
Dance Dance Revolution
Dance Dance Revolution 2ndReMix
Dance Dance Revolution 2ndReMix Append Club Version Vol.1
Dance Dance Revolution 2ndReMix Append Club Version Vol.2
Dancing Blade Katteni Momotenshi II ~Tears of Eden~
Dancing Stage featuring True Kiss Destination
Eisei Meijin III
Fisherman's Bait 2: Big Ol' Bass
Glint Glitters
GuitarFreaks
Gungage
International Track & Field 2000
Kinniku Banzuke Vol. 1: Ore ga Saikyou no Otoko
Konami Arcade Classics
Melty Lancer: The 3rd Planet
Metal Gear Solid: VR Missions
NBA In The Zone '99
NHL Blades of Steel '99
Jersey Devil (Japan)
Silent Hill
Soul of the Samurai (called Ronin Blade in Europe)
Tokimeki Memorial 2
Tokimeki Memorial Drama Series Vol. 3 Tabidachi no Uta
A Bug's Life (Japan)
Vandal Hearts II
Virgin Fleet
beatmania APPEND GOTTAMIX
beatmania APPEND 4thMIX
Tarzan (Japan)
pop'n music
pop'n music 2
Yu-Gi-Oh! True Duel Monsters: Sealed Memories (Japan) / Yu-Gi-Oh! Forbidden Memories (North America & Europe)
Glint Glitters
Goo! Goo! Soundy
Harlem Beat: You're the One
 2000
Aitakute... Your Smiles in My Heart
Bishi Bashi Special 3: Step Champ
Dance Dance Revolution 3rdMix
Dance Dance Revolution Best Hits
Dance Dance Revolution Disney's Rave
Dancing Stage EuroMix (Europe)
Dancing Stage EuroMix (Australia)
Dancing Stage featuring Dreams Come True
Eldergate
ESPN Great Outdoor Games: Bass Fishing
ESPN MLS GameNight
Fisherman's Bait 3
The Grinch
Hunter X Hunter: Maboroshi no Greed Island
ISS Pro Evolution
Kinniku Banzuke: Road to Sasuke
Kinniku Banzuke Vol. 2: Aratanarugenkai Enochousen!
Kinniku Banzuke Vol. 3: Saikyou no Challenger Tanjyou!
Love Hina: Ai wa Kotoba no Chuu ni
Love Hina 2: Kotoba wa Konayuki no You ni
The Mummy
Nightmare Creatures II
Oha Star Dance Dance Revolution
NHL Blades of Steel 2000
Tokimeki Memorial 2 Substories: Dancing Summer Vacation
Winning Eleven 2000
Woody Woodpecker Racing
beatmania APPEND 5thMIX
beatmania BEST HITS
beatmania APPEND ClubMIX
beatmania APPEND GOTTAMIX2 ~Going Global~
beatmania (Europe)
beatmania featuring Dreams Come True
Gensō Suiko Gaiden Vol. 1: Harmonia no Kenshi
pop'n music: Animation Melody
pop'n music: Disney Tunes
pop'n music 3
pop'n music 4
Hyper Pachinko
 2001
Castlevania Chronicles
Dance Dance Revolution
Dance Dance Revolution 4thMix
Dance Dance Revolution 5thMix
Dance Dance Revolution Disney Mix
Dancing Stage Disney Mix (Europe)
Dancing Stage Disney Mix (Australia)
F1 World Grand Prix 2000
Ganbare Goemon: Ōedo Daikaiten
Gensō Suiko Gaiden Vol. 2: Crystal Valley no Kettou
Goemon: Shin Sedai Shūmei!
Hunter X Hunter: Ubawareta Aura Stone
ISS Pro Evolution 2
beatmania THE SOUND OF TOKYO
pop'n music 5
Tekunobībī
Tokimeki Memorial 2 Substories: Leaping School Festival
Tokimeki Memorial 2 Substories: Memories Ringing On
Tokimeki Memorial 2 Taisen Puzzle Dama
 2002
Captain Tsubasa: Aratanaru Densetsu Joshou
Dance Dance Revolution Konamix
Dancing Stage Party Edition
Hikaru no Go: Heian Gensou Ibunroku
Hikaru no Go: Insei Choujou Kessen
Kaettekita Cyborg Kuro-Chan
Martial Beat
Martial Beat 2
Mini Moni Dice de Pyon!
Prince of Tennis
Prince of Tennis: Sweat & Tears
Pro Evolution Soccer
beatmania 6thMIX + CORE REMIX
pop'n music 6
Super GALS! Kotobuki Ran Special (Coolmen Get You Gals Party)
Pro Evolution Soccer 2
Mini Moni Step Pyon Pyon Pyon
 2003
Dancing Stage Fever (Europe)
Dancing Stage Fever (Australia)
Gegege no Kitarō: Ibun Youkaitan
Pinobee
 2004
Dancing Stage Fusion
 Cancelled Games
Kumite: The Fighter's Edge
Monster Force
Pinky & the Brain
TwinBee Miracle
Konami Rally

PlayStation 2
 2000
7 Blades
DrumMania
Bouken Jidai Katsugeki Goemon
ESPN International Track & Field
ESPN Winter X-Games Snowboarding
Gradius III & IV
Guitar Freaks 3rd Mix & DrumMania 2nd Mix
Jikkyō Powerful Pro Yakyū 7
Silent Scope
Winning Eleven 5
beatmania IIDX 3rd Style
 2001
Crash Bandicoot: The Wrath of Cortex (distributed by Konami)
Ephemeral Fantasia
ESPN MLS ExtraTime
ESPN NBA 2Night
ESPN NFL PrimeTime 2002
ESPN National Hockey Night
ESPN Winter X-Games Snowboarding 2002
ESPN X-Games Skateboarding
Frogger: The Great Quest
Jikkyō Powerful Pro Yakyū 8
Metal Gear Solid 2: Sons of Liberty
ParaParaParadise
Police 911
Pro Evolution Soccer (Europe & Australia) / Winning Eleven 5 (Japan, Asia & North America)
Ring of Red
Shadow of Memories
Silent Hill 2
Silent Scope 2: Dark Silhouette
Tokimeki Memorial 3
Yu-Gi-Oh! True Duel Monsters II: Inherited Memories (Japan) / Yu-Gi-Oh! The Duelists of the Roses (North America & Europe)
Zone of the Enders
beatmania IIDX 4th Style
beatmania IIDX 5th Style
KEYBOARDMANIA
 2002
Contra: Shattered Soldier
DDRMAX Dance Dance Revolution
DDRMAX Dance Dance Revolution 6thMix
ESPN International Winter Sports
ESPN NBA 2Night 2002
Evolution Skateboarding
Evolution Snowboarding
Jikkyō Powerful Pro Yakyū 9
K-1 World Grand Prix 2002
Konami's Moto-X
NBA Starting Five
Pro Evolution Soccer 2 (Europe & Australia) / Winning Eleven 6 (Japan, Asia & North America)
Silent Scope 3
Suikoden III
Tokimeki Memorial Girl's Side
Whiteout
WTA Tour Tennis
beatmania IIDX 6th Style
pop'n music 7
KEYBOARDMANIA II (2nd & 3rdMIX)
 2003
Castlevania: Lament of Innocence
DreamMix TV World Fighters
Dance Dance Revolution Extreme (Japan)
Dance Dance Revolution Party Collection
Dancing Stage Fever
Dancing Stage MegaMix (Europe)
Dancing Stage MegaMix (Australia)
DDRMAX2 Dance Dance Revolution
DDRMAX2 Dance Dance Revolution 7thMix
Fisherman's Challenge
Frogger Beyond
Jikkyō Powerful Pro Yakyū 10
Metal Gear Solid 2: Substance
Pro Evolution Soccer 3 (Europe & Australia) / Winning Eleven 7 (Japan, Asia & North America)
Silent Hill 3
Teenage Mutant Ninja Turtles
Tour de France: Centenary Edition
Winning Eleven 6: Final Evolution (Japan)
Yu-Gi-Oh! The Duelists of the Roses
Zone of the Enders: The 2nd Runner
pop'n music 8
pop'n music BEST HITS
Gegege no Kitaro
 2004
Airforce Delta Strike (North America) / Airforce Delta: Blue Wing Knights (Japan) / Deadly Skies III (Europe)
Cy Girls
Dance Dance Revolution Extreme (North America)
Dancing Stage Fusion (Europe)
Dancing Stage Fusion (Australia)
DDR Festival Dance Dance Revolution
Firefighter F.D. 18
Flame of Recca: Final Burning
Gradius V
Crash Nitro Kart (Japan)
Jikkyō Powerful Pro Yakyū 11
Lifeline
Meine Liebe
Metal Gear Solid 3: Snake Eater
Neo Contra
Pro Evolution Soccer 4 (Europe & Australia) / Winning Eleven 8 (Japan, Asia & North America)
Pro Yakyū Spirits 2004
Silent Hill 4: The Room
Suikoden IV
Teenage Mutant Ninja Turtles 2: Battle Nexus
U Move Super Sports
Winning Eleven 7 International (Japan)
Yu-Gi-Oh! Capsule Monster Coliseum
Beatmania IIDX 7th Style
Beatmania IIDX 8th Style
pop'n music 9
pop'n music 10
 2005
Castlevania: Curse of Darkness
Crime Life: Gang Wars
Dance Dance Revolution Extreme 2
Dancing Stage Max
Enthusia Professional Racing
Gantz: The Game
Jikkyō Powerful Pro Yakyū 12
Metal Gear Solid 3: Subsistence
Nano Breaker
Pro Evolution Soccer 5 (Europe & Australia) / Winning Eleven 9 (Japan, Asia & North America)
Pro Yakyū Spirits 2
Remote Control Dandy SF
Rumble Roses
S.L.A.I.: Steel Lancer Arena International
Suikoden Tactics
Teenage Mutant Ninja Turtles 3: Mutant Nightmare
Wallace & Gromit:The Curse Of The Were-rabbit
OZ - Over Zenith (Japan) / The Sword of Etheria (Europe)
Beatmania IIDX 9th Style
Beatmania IIDX 10th Style
pop'n music 11
 2006
Dance Dance Revolution Strike
Dance Dance Revolution SuperNova (North America)
Bleach: Blade Battlers
Jikkyō Powerful Pro Yakyū 13
Pro Evolution Soccer 6 (Europe & Australia) / Winning Eleven 2007 (North America) / Winning Eleven 10 (Japan & Asia)
Pro Yakyū Spirits 3
Suikoden V
Negima!? 3rd Time
Beatmania (North America)
Beatmania IIDX 11: IIDXRED
Beatmania IIDX 12: Happy Sky
pop'n music 12: IROHA
Pop'n Music 13 Carnival
GuitarFreaks V & DrumMania V
 2007
Dance Dance Revolution SuperNova (Japan)
Dance Dance Revolution SuperNova 2 (North America)
Bleach: Blade Battlers 2nd
Dancing Stage SuperNova
Flatout 2 (Published in Japan by Konami, published worldwide by Empire Interactive)
Jikkyō Powerful Pro Yakyū 14
Jikkyō Powerful Major League 2 (Japan) / MLB Power Pros (North America)
Negima!? Dreaming Princess
Pro Evolution Soccer 2008 (Europe, Australia & North America) / Winning Eleven 2008 (Japan & Asia)
Pro Yakyū Spirits 4
Beatmania IIDX 13: Distorted
pop'n music 14: FEVER!
Yu-Gi-Oh! Duel Monsters GX: Tag Force Evolution (Japan) / Yu-Gi-Oh! GX: Tag Force Evolution (Europe) / Yu-Gi-Oh! GX: The Beginning of Destiny (North America)
 2008
Dance Dance Revolution Disney Channel Edition
Dance Dance Revolution SuperNova 2 (Japan)
Dance Dance Revolution X (North America)
Jikkyō Powerful Pro Yakyū 15
Jikkyō Powerful Major League 3 (Japan) / MLB Power Pros 2008 (North America)
Pro Evolution Soccer 2009 (Europe, Australia & North America) / Winning Eleven 2009 (Japan & Asia)
Pro Yakyū Spirits 5
Silent Hill: Origins
Beatmania IIDX 14: Gold
Beatmania IIDX 15: DJ Troopers
 2009
Dance Dance Revolution X (Japan)
J-League Winning Eleven 2009 Club Championship
Jikkyō Powerful Pro Yakyū 2009
Jikkyō Powerful Major League 2009
Pro Evolution Soccer 2010 (Europe, Australia & North America) / Winning Eleven 2010 (Japan & Asia)
Pro Yakyū Spirits 6
beatmania IIDX 16: Empress + Premium Best
 2010
Silent Hill: Shattered Memories
Pro Yakyū Spirits 2010
Pro Evolution Soccer 2011 (Europe, Australia & North America) / Winning Eleven 2011 (Japan & Asia)
 2011
Pro Evolution Soccer 2012 (Europe, Australia & North America) / Winning Eleven 2012 (Japan & Asia)
Pro Yakyū Spirits 2011
 2012
Pro Evolution Soccer 2013 (Europe, Australia & North America) / Winning Eleven 2013 (Japan & Asia)
 2013
Pro Evolution Soccer 2014 (Europe, Australia & North America) / Winning Eleven 2014 (Japan & Asia)

PlayStation 3
 2006
Mahjong Fight Club
 2007
Pro Evolution Soccer 2008 (Europe, Australia & North America) / Winning Eleven 2008 (Japan & Asia)
Pro Yakyū Spirits 4
 2008
American Idol 
Hellboy: Science of Evil (North America & Europe)
Metal Gear Solid 4: Guns of the Patriots
Metal Gear Online
Pro Evolution Soccer 2009 (Europe, Australia & North America) / Winning Eleven 2009 (Japan & Asia)
Pro Yakyū Spirits 5
Silent Hill: Homecoming
 2009
Pro Yakyū Spirits 6
Pro Evolution Soccer 2010 (Europe, Australia & North America) / Winning Eleven 2010 (Japan & Asia)
Tornado Outbreak
 2010
Saw: The Video Game
Saw II: Flesh & Blood
Castlevania: Lords of Shadow
Pro Evolution Soccer 2011 (Europe, Australia & North America) / Winning Eleven 2011 (Japan & Asia)
Def Jam Rapstar
Jikkyō Powerful Pro Yakyū 2010
Pro Yakyū Spirits 2010
Dance Dance Revolution
No More Heroes: Heroes' Paradise
 2011
El Shaddai: Ascension of the Metatron (Europe only)
Jikkyō Powerful Pro Yakyū 2011
Pro Yakyū Spirits 2011
Metal Gear Solid HD Collection
Bleach: Soul Resurrección
Pro Evolution Soccer 2012 (Europe, Australia & North America) / Winning Eleven 2012 (Japan & Asia)
Ra.One (Europe & Japan)
 2012
Birds of Steel
Blades of Time
Jikkyō Powerful Pro Yakyū 2012
Silent Hill: Downpour
Pro Yakyū Spirits 2012
NeverDead
Silent Hill HD Collection
Zone of the Enders HD Collection
Doctor Who: The Eternity Clock
Pro Evolution Soccer 2013 (Europe, Australia & North America) / Winning Eleven 2013 (Japan & Asia)
 2013
Jikkyō Powerful Pro Yakyū 2013
Metal Gear Rising: Revengeance
Pro Yakyū Spirits 2013
Pro Evolution Soccer 2014 (Europe, Australia & North America) / Winning Eleven 2014 (Japan & Asia)
The Snowman and the Snowdog (Europe, Australia, USA, Japan & Asia)
 2014
Castlevania: Lords of Shadow 2
Jikkyō Powerful Pro Yakyū 2014
Pro Yakyū Spirits 2014
Metal Gear Solid V: Ground Zeroes
Pro Evolution Soccer 2015 (Europe, Australia & North America) / Winning Eleven 2015 (Japan & Asia)
 2015
Pro Yakyū Spirits 2015
Metal Gear Solid V: The Phantom Pain
Pro Evolution Soccer 2016 (Europe, Australia & North America) / Winning Eleven 2016 (Japan & Asia)
 2016
Jikkyō Powerful Pro Yakyū 2016
Pro Evolution Soccer 2017 (Europe, Australia & North America) / Winning Eleven 2017 (Japan & Asia)
 2017
Jikkyō Powerful Pro Yakyū Championship 2017
Pro Evolution Soccer 2018 (Europe, Australia & North America) / Winning Eleven 2018 (Japan & Asia)

PlayStation Network
 Castlevania: Harmony of Despair
 Detana!! TwinBee
 GTI Club+: Rally Côte d'Azur
 Yu-Gi-Oh! 5D's Decade Duels
 Yu-Gi-Oh! Legacy of the Duelist
 Yu-Gi-Oh! Millenium Duels (North America only)
 Zombie Apocalypse

PlayStation 4
 2014
 Metal Gear Solid V: Ground Zeroes
 Pro Evolution Soccer 2015 (Europe, Australia & North America) / World Soccer Winning Eleven 2015 (Japan & Asia)
 2015
 Metal Gear Solid V: The Phantom Pain
 Pro Evolution Soccer 2016 (Europe, Australia, North America & Asia) / Winning Eleven 2016 (Japan)
 2016
 Jikkyō Powerful Pro Yakyū 2016
 Pro Evolution Soccer 2017 (Europe, Australia, North America & Asia) / Winning Eleven 2017 (Japan)
 2017
 Pro Evolution Soccer 2018 (Europe, Australia, North America & Asia) / Winning Eleven 2018 (Japan)
 2018
 Jikkyō Powerful Pro Yakyū 2018
 Mantis Burn Racing (physical format in Japan only)
 Metal Gear Survive
 Pro Evolution Soccer 2019 (Europe, Australia, North America & Asia) / Winning Eleven 2019 (Japan)
 Super Bomberman R
 Zone of the Enders: The 2nd Runner MARS (Europe, Australia & North America) / Anubis: Zone of The Enders MARS (Japan & Asia)
 2019
 Arcade Classics Anniversary Collection
 Castlevania Anniversary Collection
 Contra Anniversary Collection
 Contra: Rogue Corps
 eFootball PES 2020 (Europe, Australia, North America & Asia) / eFootball Winning Eleven 2020 (Japan)
 Pro Yakyū Spirits 2019
 2020
 eBaseball Powerful Pro Baseball 2020
 eFootball PES 2021 Season Update
 Skelattack
 2021
Super Bomberman R Online
eFootball
 2022
Yu-Gi-Oh! Master Duel
eBaseball Powerful Pro Yakyū 2022
Teenage Mutant Ninja Turtles: The Cowabunga Collection
 2023
Super Bomberman R 2
WBSC eBASEBALL: Power Pros

Downloadable PS4 
 Yu-Gi-Oh! Legacy of the Duelist
 Scramble
 Mr. Goemon
 Gradius
 A-jax
 Salamander
 TwinBee
 Flak Attack
 Gradius II
 Thunder Cross
 Thunder Cross II
 Haunted Castle
 Gradius III
 P.T. 
 Detana!! TwinBee
 Circus Charlie
 
 
 Jikkyō Powerful Pro Yakyū Championship 2018

PlayStation 5 
 2021
eFootball
 2022
Yu-Gi-Oh! Master Duel
Teenage Mutant Ninja Turtles: The Cowabunga Collection
 2023
Super Bomberman R 2
CYGNI: All Guns Blazing
Silent Hill 2

X68000
 1986
Salamander
Twinbee (year To be determined)
 1987
Gradius
 1989
A Jax
 1990
Quarth
 1991
Parodius Da!
Detana!! TwinBee
 1992
Gradius II
Nama Baseball '68
 1993
Akumajō Dracula
Nemesis '90 Kai

PC Engine
 1991
Gradius
Salamander
 1992
Parodius Da!
Detana!! Twinbee
 Cancelled Games
Battle Jungler

PC-Engine (Super CD-ROM²)
 1992
Gradius II: Gofer no Yabō
Snatcher
 1993
Akumajou Dracula X: Chi no Rondo
Martial Champion
 1994
Tokimeki Memorial

Xbox
 2001
Airforce Delta Storm (North America) / Airforce Delta II (Japan) / Deadly Skies (Europe)
Silent Hill 2: Restless Dreams (North America)
 2002
Crash Bandicoot: The Wrath of Cortex (distributed by Konami)
ESPN NFL PrimeTime 2002
Metal Gear Solid 2: Substance
Shadow of Memories (Europe only)
Silent Hill 2: Inner Fears (Europe)
Whiteout
 2003
Dance Dance Revolution Ultramix (United States of America)
Teenage Mutant Ninja Turtles
 2004
Dance Dance Revolution Ultramix (North America)
Dance Dance Revolution Ultramix 2
Dancing Stage Unleashed
Pro Evolution Soccer 4 (Europe & Australia) / Winning Eleven 8 International (North America)
Silent Hill 4: The Room
Silent Scope Complete
Teenage Mutant Ninja Turtles 2: Battle Nexus
Yu-Gi-Oh! The Dawn of Destiny
 2005
Castlevania: Curse of Darkness
Dance Dance Revolution Ultramix 3
Dancing Stage Unleashed 2
Teenage Mutant Ninja Turtles 3: Mutant Nightmare
Teenage Mutant Ninja Turtles: Mutant Melee
Pro Evolution Soccer 5 (Europe & Australia) / Winning Eleven 9 (North America)
 2006
Dance Dance Revolution Ultramix 4
Dancing Stage Unleashed 2

Xbox 360
 2006
Bomberman: Act Zero (Japan, North America & Europe)
Pro Evolution Soccer 6 (Europe & Australia) / Winning Eleven 2007 (North America) / Winning Eleven X (Japan & Asia)
Pro Yakyū Spirits 3
Rumble Roses XX (Japan, North America & Europe)
 2007
Dance Dance Revolution Universe (North America)
Dance Dance Revolution Universe 2 (North America)
Dancing Stage Universe (Europe)
Pro Evolution Soccer 2008 (Europe, Australia & North America) / Winning Eleven 2008 (Japan & Asia)
 2008
Dance Dance Revolution Universe 3 (North America)
Hellboy: The Science of Evil (North America & Europe)
Otomedius Gorgeous
Pro Evolution Soccer 2009 (Europe, Australia & North America) / Winning Eleven 2009 (Japan & Asia)
Silent Hill: Homecoming
 2009
Dance Dance Revolution Universe 3 Chinese Music Special Edition (Asia)
Pro Evolution Soccer 2010 (Europe, Australia & North America) / Winning Eleven 2010 (Japan & Asia)
Saw: The Video Game
Tornado Outbreak
 2010
Adrenalin Misfits
Castlevania: Lords of Shadow
Def Jam Rapstar
Dance Masters (North America) / DanceEvolution (Europe, Australia & Japan)
Ninety-Nine Nights II
No More Heroes: Heroes' Paradise
Pro Evolution Soccer 2011 (Europe, Australia & North America) / Winning Eleven 2011 (Japan & Asia)
Saw II: Flesh & Blood
 2011
El Shaddai: Ascension of the Metatron (Europe only)
Dance Dance Revolution
Metal Gear Solid HD Collection
Otomedius Excellent
Pro Evolution Soccer 2012 (Europe, Australia & North America) / Winning Eleven 2012 (Japan & Asia)
 2012
Birds of Steel
Blades of Time
NeverDead
Pro Evolution Soccer 2013 (Europe, Australia & North America) / Winning Eleven 2013 (Japan & Asia)
Silent Hill: Downpour
Silent Hill HD Collection
Zone of the Enders HD Collection
 2013
Metal Gear Rising: Revengeance
Pro Evolution Soccer 2014 (Europe, Australia & North America) / Winning Eleven 2014 (Japan & Asia)
 2014
Castlevania: Lords of Shadow 2
Metal Gear Solid V: Ground Zeroes
Pro Evolution Soccer 2015 (Europe, Australia & North America) / Winning Eleven 2015 (Japan & Asia)
 2015
Metal Gear Solid V: The Phantom Pain
Pro Evolution Soccer 2016 (Europe, Australia & North America) / Winning Eleven 2016 (Japan & Asia)
 2016
Pro Evolution Soccer 2017 (Europe, Australia & North America) / Winning Eleven 2017 (Japan & Asia)
 2017
Pro Evolution Soccer 2018 (Europe, Australia & North America) / Winning Eleven 2018 (Japan & Asia)

Xbox Live Arcade
 BurgerTime World Tour
 Castlevania: Harmony of Despair
 Castlevania: Symphony of the Night
 Coffeetime Crosswords
 Contra
 Frogger
 Frogger 2
 Frogger: Hyper Arcade Edition
 Gyruss
 Leedmees
 Rhythm Party
 Rush'n Attack
 Rush'n Attack: Ex-Patriot
 Scramble
 Skullgirls
 Super Contra
 Teenage Mutant Ninja Turtles
 Time Pilot
 Track & Field
 The Simpsons Arcade Game
 Vandal Hearts: Flames of Judgment
 Yie Ar Kung Fu
 Yu-Gi-Oh! 5D's: Decade Duels
 Yu-Gi-Oh! Legacy of the Duelist
 Yu-Gi-Oh! Millenium Duels
 X-Men
 Zombie Apocalypse

Xbox One
 2014
Metal Gear Solid V: Ground Zeroes
Pro Evolution Soccer 2015 (Europe, Australia & North America) / Winning Eleven 2015 (Japan & Asia)
 2015
Yu-Gi-Oh! Legacy of the Duelist
Metal Gear Solid V: The Phantom Pain
Pro Evolution Soccer 2016 (Europe, Australia & North America) / Winning Eleven 2016 (Japan & Asia)
 2016
Pro Evolution Soccer 2017 (Europe, Australia & North America) / Winning Eleven 2017 (Japan & Asia)
 2017
Pro Evolution Soccer 2018 (Europe, Australia & North America) / Winning Eleven 2018 (Japan & Asia)
 2018
Metal Gear Survive
Pro Evolution Soccer 2019 (Europe, Australia & North America) / Winning Eleven 2019 (Japan & Asia)
Super Bomberman R
 2019
Arcade Classics Anniversary Collection
Castlevania Anniversary Collection
Contra Anniversary Collection
Contra: Rogue Corps
eFootball PES 2020
 2020
Skelattack
 2021
Super Bomberman R Online
eFootball
 2022
Yu-Gi-Oh! Master Duel
Teenage Mutant Ninja Turtles: The Cowabunga Collection
 2023
Super Bomberman R 2

Xbox Series X/S
 2021
Super Bomberman R Online
Yu-Gi-Oh! Master Duel
eFootball
 2022
Yu-Gi-Oh! Master Duel
Teenage Mutant Ninja Turtles: The Cowabunga Collection
 2023
Super Bomberman R 2

Game Boy
 1989
The Castlevania Adventure
Motocross Maniacs
 1990
Quarth
NFL Football
Skate or Die: Bad 'n Rad
Nemesis
Pop'n TwinBee
Teenage Mutant Ninja Turtles: Fall of the Foot Clan
 1991
Operation C
Bill Elliott's NASCAR Challenge
Double Dribble
Cave Noire
Castlevania II: Belmont's Revenge
Parodius
Blades of Steel
Nemesis II (called Gradius: The Interstellar Assault in North America.)
Ganbare Goemon: Sarawareta Ebisumaru!
 1992
Star Trek 25th Anniversary
Teenage Mutant Ninja Turtles II: Back from the Sewers
Track and Field
World Circuit Series
Ultra Golf
Nanonote
Tiny Toon Adventures: Babs' Big Break
 1993
Zen: Intergalactic Ninja
Tiny Toon Adventures 2: Montana's Movie Madness
Top Gun: Guts and Glory
Kid Dracula
Raging Fighter
Batman: The Animated Series
Teenage Mutant Ninja Turtles III: Radical Rescue
God Medicine
 1994
Contra: The Alien Wars
Tiny Toon Adventures: Wacky Sports Challenge
 1995
Animaniacs
 1997
Castlevania Legends
Mystical Ninja Starring Goemon
Konami GB Collection Vol. 1
Konami GB Collection Vol. 2
 1998
Konami GB Collection Vol. 3
Konami GB Collection Vol. 4
International Superstar Soccer
Power Pro GB
BakuchChō Retrieve Master
Koukiatsu Boy
Yu-Gi-Oh! Duel Monsters

Game Boy Color
1998
Yu-Gi-Oh! Duel Monsters
1999
Azure Dreams
Beat Breaker
beatmania GB
beatmania GB2 Gotcha Mix
Bullet Battlers
International Rally
International Superstar Soccer 99
International Track & Field
Kinniku Banzuke GB
Ganbare Goemon: Mononoke Sugoroku
Motocross Maniacs 2
NBA In The Zone
NBA In The Zone 2000
NHL Blades of Steel
Owarai Yoiko No Game Dou: Oyaji Sagashite 3 Choume
Pocket G1 Stable
Power Pro Kun Pocket
Spawn
Survival Kids
Tokimeki Memorial Pocket Culture Hen
Tokimeki Memorial Pocket Sport Hen
Yu-Gi-Oh! Duel Monsters II: Dark Duel Stories
2000
Airforce Delta
Battle Fishers
beatmania GB Gotcha Mix 2
Cyborg Kuro Chan
Cyborg Kuro Chan 2
Dance Dance Revolution GB
Dance Dance Revolution GB2
ESPN International Track & Field
ESPN National Hockey Night
Ganbare Goemon: Hoshizorashi Dynamites Arawaru!!
beatmania GB Gotcha Mix 2
The Grinch
Hunter X Hunter: Hunter no Keifu
International Rally
International Superstar Soccer 2000
Kinniku Banzuke GB2
Metal Gear: Ghost Babel
Millennium Winter Sports
The Mummy
NHL Blades of Steel 2000
pop'n music GB
pop'n music GB: Animated Melody
pop'n music GB: Disney Tunes
Power Pro Kun Pocket 2
Survival Kids 2: Dasshutsu! Futago Shima
Woody Woodpecker Racing
Yu-Gi-Oh! Duel Monsters III: Tri-Holy God Advent
Yu-Gi-Oh! Duel Monsters 4: Battle of the Powerful Duelists – Jounouchi Deck
Yu-Gi-Oh! Duel Monsters 4: Battle of the Powerful Duelists – Kaiba Deck
Yu-Gi-Oh! Duel Monsters 4: Battle of the Powerful Duelists – Yugi Deck
Yu-Gi-Oh! Monster Capture GB
2001
Super GALS! Kotobuki Ran
Super GALS! Kotobuki Ran 2
Battle Fishers
Dance Dance Revolution GB3
Dance Dance Revolution GB Disney Mix
Gyouten Ningen Batseelor - Doctor Guy no Yabou
Hunter X Hunter: Kindan no Hihou
Kinniku Banzuke GB 3
Oha Star Dance Dance Revolution GB

Game Boy Advance
2001
Adventure of Tokyo Disney Sea
Castlevania: Circle of the Moon
ESPN Final Round Golf 2002
ESPN X Games Skateboarding
Field of Nine: Digital Edition 2001
Flame of Recca: THE GAME
Frogger's Adventures: Temple of the Frog
Gadget Racers
Gensō Suikoden Card Stories
GetBackers Dakkanya: Jigoku no Scaramouche
Gradius Advance
International Superstar Soccer
J.League Pocket
JGTO Golf Master Mobile
Jurassic Park III: Island Attack
Jurassic Park III: Park Builder
Jurassic Park III: The DNA Factor
Kinniku Banzuke: Kimeru! Kiseki no Kanzen Seiha
Kinniku Banzuke: Kongou-Kun no Daibouken!
Konami Krazy Racers
Mobile Pro Yakyuu: Kantoku no Saihai
Monster Guardians
Play Novel: Silent Hill
Power Pro Kun Pocket 3
Star Communicator
Tanbi Musou Meine Liebe
Yu-Gi-Oh! Dungeon Dice Monsters
Yu-Gi-Oh! Duel Monsters 5: Expert 1
Yu-Gi-Oh! Duel Monsters 6: Expert 2
Yuujou no Victory Goal 4v4 Arashi: Get the Goal!
Zone of the Enders: The Fist of Mars
2002
Animal Mania: Dokidoki Aishou Check
Beast Shooter: Mezase Beast King
Captain Tsubasa: Eikou no Kiseki
Croket! Yume no Banker Survival!
ESPN Great Outdoor Games: Bass 2002
ESPN International Winter Sports 2002
ESPN X Games Snowboarding
Groove Adventure Rave: Hikari to Yami no Daikessen
J.League Pocket 2
J-League Winning Eleven Advance 2002
K-1 Pocket Grand Prix
K-1 Pocket Grand Prix 2
Kami no Kijutsu: Illusion of the Evil Eyes
Mail de Cute
Monster Gate
Motocross Maniacs Advance
Power Pro Kun Pocket 4
Rave Master: Special Attack Force
WTA Tour Tennis
Castlevania: Harmony of Dissonance
Contra Advance: The Alien Wars
Disney Sports Soccer
Frogger Advance: The Great Quest
Frogger's Adventure 2: The Lost Wand
Disney Sports Skateboarding
Disney Sports Snowboarding
Disney Sports Basketball
Disney Sports Motocross
Goemon: New Age Shutsudou!
Konami Collector Series: Arcade Advanced
Silent Scope
Airforce Delta Storm
Crash Bandicoot: The Huge Adventure (Published and distributed along with Universal Interactive for the Japanese release.)
Spyro: Season of Ice (Published and distributed along with Universal Interactive for the Japanese release.)
Tennis no Oji-Sama: Aim at the Victory!
Tennis no Oji-Sama: Genius Boys Academy
Wagamama * Fairy: Mirumo de Pon! Ougon Maracas no Densetsu
Isseki Hacchou: Kore 1-pon de 8 Shurui!
Bass Tsuri Shiyouze!: Tournament wa Senryaku da!
Shaman King Chou Senjiryakketsu 2
Shaman King Chou Senjiryakketsu 3
World Soccer Winning Eleven
Yu-Gi-Oh! Duel Monsters 7: The Duelcity Legend
Mini Moni: Onegai Ohoshi-sama!
2003
Ashita no Joe Makkani Moeagare!
Croket! 2: Yami no Bank to Ban Joou
Croket! 3: Granyuu Oukoku no Nazo
Frogger's Journey: The Forgotten Relic
Gegege no Kitarou: Kiki Ippatsu! Youkai Rettou
GetBackers Dakkanya: Jagan Fuuin!
GetBackers Dakkanya: Metropolis Dakkan Sakusen!
Hunter X Hunter: Minna Tomodachi Daisakusen!!
International Superstar Soccer Advance
Mermaid Melody Pichi Pichi Pitch
Mermaid Melody Pichi Pichi Pitch Pichi Pichi Party
Minna no Ouji-Sama
Monster Gate 2: Dai Inaru Dungeon
Mugenborg
Power Pro Kun Pocket 5
Power Pro Kun Pocket 6
Yu-Gi-Oh! Reshef of Destruction
Yu-Gi-Oh! Worldwide Edition: Stairway to the Destined Duel
Sengoku Kakumei Gaiden
Tantei Gakuen Q: Meitantei Hakimida!
Teenage Mutant Ninja Turtles
Tennis no Oji-Sama 2003: Cool Blue
Tennis no Oji-Sama 2003: Passion Red
Ninja Five-O
Castlevania: Aria of Sorrow
Boktai: The Sun Is in Your Hand
Crash Bandicoot 2: N-Tranced (Published and distributed along with Universal Interactive for the Japanese release.)
Wagamama * Fairy: Mirumo de Pon! Hachinin no Toki no Yousei
Wagamama * Fairy: Mirumo de Pon! Taisen Mahoudama
Whistle! Dai 37-kai Tokyo-to Chuugakkou Sougou Taiiku Soccer Taikai
2004
TMNT 2: Battle Nexus
Boktai 2: Solar Boy Django
Croket! Great Jikuu no Boukensha
Croket! 4: Bank no Mori no Mamorigami
Genseishin Justirisers: Souchaku! Chikyuu no Senshitachi
Get Ride! AMDriver: Senkou no Hero Tanjou
Get Ride! AMDriver: Shutsugeki! Battle Party
Mermaid Melody Pichi Pichi Pitch Pichi Pichitto Live Start
Power Pro Kun Pocket 1+2
Power Pro Kun Pocket 7
Pyuu to Fuku! Jaguar: Byuu to Deru! Megane-Kun
Crash Nitro Kart (Published and distributed along with Universal Interactive for the Japanese release.)
Shaman King: Master of Spirits
Tantei Gakuen Q: Kyuukyoku no Trick ni Idome!
Tennis no Oji-Sama 2004: Glorious Gold
Tennis no Oji-Sama 2004: Stylish Silver
Wagamama * Fairy: Mirumo de Pon! Nazo no Kagi to Shinjitsu no Tobira
Wagamama * Fairy: Mirumo de Pon! Yume no Kakera
Yu-Gi-Oh! Duel Monsters Begineers Pack
Yu-Gi-Oh! Duel Monsters Expert 3
Yu-Gi-Oh! Duel Monsters International 2 (Japan) / Yu-Gi-Oh! 7 Trials to Glory: World Championship Tournament 2005 (North America) / Yu-Gi-Oh! Day of the Duelist: World Championship Tournament 2005 (Europe)
Yu-Gi-Oh! Sugoroku's Board Game
2005
Animal Yokochou: Doki*Doki Kyushutsu Daisakusen! no Maki
Boktai: Sabata's Counterattack
Kappa no Kai-Kata: Katan Daibouken
Mar Heaven: Knockin' on Heaven's Door
Shaman King: Legacy of the Spirits
Shaman King: Master of Spirits 2
Kessakusen! Ganbare Goemon 1+2: Yukihime to Magginesu
Wagamama * Fairy: Mirumo de Pon! DokiDoki Memorial Panic
Winx Club
Yu-Gi-Oh! Duel Monsters GX: Aim to be Duel King! (Japan) / Yu-Gi-Oh! GX: Duel Academy (North America)
2006
Animal Yokochou: Shinkyuu Shiken! no Kan
Power Pocket Dash
Winx Club: Quest for the Codex
Yu-Gi-Oh! Duel Monsters Expert 2006 (Japan) / Yu-Gi-Oh! Ultimate Masters: World Championship Tournament 2006 (North America) / Yu-Gi-Oh World Championship Tournament 2006 (Europe)
Yu-Gi-Oh! World Championship 2006 Set

Mobile (Browser)
 2010
Dragon Collection (GREE)
Sengoku Collection (Mobage)
 2011
Busou Shinki BATTLE COMMUNICATION (Mobage)
Crows x Worst: Saikyō Densetsu (GREE)
 (GREE)
Pro Baseball Dream Nine (GREE/Mobage)
 2012
Crows x Worst: Kenka Retsuden (Mobage)
J-League Dream Legends (Mobage)
Pro Baseball Dream Nine (mixi)
StarWars Collection (GREE)
StarWars Collection: Jedi vs Sith (GREE)
World Soccer Collection (GREE/Mobage)
 2013
 (Mobage)

iOS
 2008
Frogger
Silent Hill: The Escape
 2009
Dance Dance Revolution S / Lite / S+
Metal Gear Solid Touch
Tomena Sanner

Krazy Kart Racing
 2010
 Touch
Castlevania Puzzle: Encore of the Night
Draw Parking
Wire Way
Double Dribble Fastbreak
 2010
Elebits Capture
Frogger Inferno
Hyper Sports Winter
Hyper Sports Track & Field
jubeat plus
 2011
Alcatraz Breakout
 2011
Frogger Free
Frogger Decades
Kid vs Kat: Kat Attack
Pro Baseball Dream Nine
REFLEC BEAT plus (Japan)
Gesundheit!
X-Men
Frogger Pinball
 2012
Dragon Collection
Metal Gear Solid: Social Ops
Million Paradise
Monster Retsuden Oreca Battle
 2012
REFLEC BEAT + (WorldWide)
 2013
MLB Dream Nine Mobile
Slot Revolution
Domo Jump
DraColle & Poker
GITADORA
LINE GoGo! TwinBee

DanceDanceRevolution Pocket Edition
Super Slot Stars
Star Soldier for GREE
Star Wars: Force Collection
PES Manager
Pop 'n Rhythmin
 2013
Star Soldier for GREE
 SP
 2014
Bomberman
Dragon Collection RPG: Shōnen to Ryū-gari no Ryū
Dragon Dice
Saru Pyon!
Shin Prince of Tennis: Puzzle & Tennis
Sudoku: Daily Challenge
Swords & Poker Adventures
Min'na de bishibashi
Nisekoi Majikore!?
 2014)

Yu-Gi-Oh! Duel Generation
 2015
Crows x Worst Dynamite
Crows x Worst V
Pes Club Manager
UEFA Champions League PES Flick
Chronos Ring
Kingdom Dragonion
Kyoshin Sensō)

 2016
VS! Bomberman

Yu-Gi-Oh! Duel Links
 2017
PES 2017 - Pro Evolution Soccer
 2018
: Lost Fantasium

Pixel Puzzle Collection (Worldwide) / Puzzle Picross (Japan)
 2019
Dankira!!! Boys, be DANCING!
Castlevania Grimoire of Souls
Love Plus EVERY
Frogger in Toy Town
beatmania IIDX ULTIMATE MOBILE
 2020
Castlevania: Symphony of the Night
 2021
Pawapuro Puzzle
Yu-Gi-Oh! Master Duel
Yu-Gi-Oh! Cross Duel
 2022
Frogger and the Rumbling Ruins
Amazing Bomberman
 TBD
Sound Voltex ULTIMATE MOBILE
DanceDanceRevolution ULTIMATE MOBILE
Busou Shinki R

Android
 2010
Mobile Powerful Pro Baseball 3D
Krazy Kart Racing
 2011
X-Men
 2012
KPE Dream Master
Metal Gear Solid: Social Ops)
Mobile Power Pros 2012 for au Smart Pass
Quiz Magic Academy SP
Pro Baseball Dream Nine 
World Soccer Collection
 2013
Star Wars: Force Collection
Mobile Power Pros 2013 for au Smart Pass
LINE GoGo! TwinBee
Tokimeki Restaurant
 2014
Bomberman
Crows x Worst: Gekitō Retsuden
Min'na de bishibashi
Dragon Collection RPG: Shōnen to Ryū-gari no Ryū
Mobile Power Pros 2014 for au Smart Pass
Monsurobatoru
Nisekoi Majikore!?
Shin Prince of Tennis: Puzzle & Tennis

 2015
Crows x Worst Dynamite
Crows x Worst V
Kingdom Dragonion

 2016
VS! Bomberman

 2017
Yu-Gi-Oh! Duel Links
PES 2017 - Pro Evolution Soccer
 2018
: Lost Fantasium

Pixel Puzzle Collection (Worldwide) / Puzzle Picross (Japan)
 2019
Dankira!!! Boys, be DANCING!
Castlevania Grimoire of Souls
Love Plus EVERY
beatmania IIDX ULTIMATE MOBILE
 2020
Castlevania: Symphony of the Night
 2021
Pawapuro Puzzle
Yu-Gi-Oh! Master Duel
Yu-Gi-Oh! Cross Duel
 TBD
Sound Voltex ULTIMATE MOBILE
DanceDanceRevolution ULTIMATE MOBILE
Busou Shinki R

Stadia
2020
Super Bomberman R Online

Amazon Luna
2020
Castlevania Anniversary Collection
Contra Anniversary Collection

Nintendo Switch
2017
Super Bomberman R (Shiny edition included)

2018
Snake Pass (Digital format in Japan only)
Mantis Burn Racing (Physical format in Japan only)

2019
Arcade Classics Anniversary Collection
Castlevania Anniversary Collection
Contra Anniversary Collection
Jikkyō Powerful Pro Yakyū
Yu-Gi-Oh! Legacy of the Duelist: Link Evolution

2020
eBaseball Powerful Pro Baseball 2020
Skelattack
Momotaro Dentetsu: Showa, Heisei, Reiwa Mo Teiban! 

2021
Castlevania Advance Collection
Solomon Program
Super Bomberman R Online
eBaseball Professional Baseball Spirits 2021: Grand Slam
Yu-Gi-Oh! Rush Duel: Saikyou Battle Royale!!
Power Pro-Kun Pocket R
Tokimeki Memorial Girl’s Side 4th Heart

2022
Getsu Fūma Den: Undying Moon
CYGNI: All Guns Blazing
Yu-Gi-Oh! Master Duel
eBaseball Powerful Pro Yakyū 2022
Teenage Mutant Ninja Turtles: The Cowabunga Collection
Yu-Gi-Oh! Rush Duel: Dawn of the Battle Royale!! Let’s Go! Go Rush!!

2023
WBSC eBASEBALL: Power Pros
Super Bomberman R 2
Momotaro Dentetsu World: Chikyuu wa Kibou de Mawatteru!

Cancelled
Hyper Sports R

Nintendo eShop 
Road Fighter
Time Pilot
Pooyan
VS. Gradius
VS. Castlevania
Hyper Sports
TwinBee
Frogger
Detana!! TwinBee
Salamander
Sunset Riders
Circus Charlie
Vendetta
Xexex

Nintendo 3DS
2011
Doctor Lautrec and the Forgotten Knights
Frogger 3D
Penguin no Mondai: The Wars
Pro Evolution Soccer 2011 3D
Pro Yakyū Spirits 2011
2012
Pro Evolution Soccer 2012 3D
Beyond the Labyrinth
New Love Plus
Metal Gear Solid: Snake Eater 3D
Tongari Boushi to Mahou no Machi
Pro Evolution Soccer 2013 3D
2013
Castlevania: Lords of Shadow - Mirror of Fate
Pro Evolution Soccer 2014
Yu-Gi-Oh! Zexal: Clash! Duel Carnival! (Japan) / Yu-Gi-Oh! Zexal: World Duel Carnival (North America & Europe)
2016
Yu-Gi-Oh! Duel Monsters: Ultimate Card Battle
Jikkyō Powerful Pro Yakyū Heroes
2017
100% Pascal Sensei: Kanpeki Paint Bombers
PriPri Chi-chan!!

3DS Virtual Console
Gradius
TwinBee Da!
Esper Dream

Nintendo DS
2004
The Prince of Tennis 2005: Crystal Drive
 2005
Castlevania: Dawn of Sorrow
Croket! DS: Tenkuu no Yuusha tachi
Dragon Booster
Frogger Helmet Chaos
Ganbare Goemon: Toukai Douchuu Ooedo Tengurigaeshi no Maki
Atsumare! Power Pro Kun no DS Koushien
Lost in Blue
Power Pocket Koushien
Power Pro Kun Pocket 8
Tao's Adventure: Curse of the Demon Seal
Teenage Mutant Ninja Turtles 3: Mutant Nightmare
Yu-Gi-Oh! Duel Monsters: Nightmare Troubadour (Japan) / Yu-Gi-Oh! Nightmare Troubadour (North America & Europe)
Korokke! DS: Tenkuu no Yuushatachi
2006
Iron Feather
Castlevania: Portrait of Ruin
My Frogger Toy Trials
Otogi-Jushi Akazukin
Yu-Gi-Oh! Duel Monsters GX Spirit Summoner (Japan) / Yu-Gi-Oh! GX: Spirit Caller (North America & Europe)
Xiaolin Showdown
Winx Club: Quest for the Codex
Kabushiki Baibai Trainer Kabutore
Kirarin Revolution Naasan to Issho
MAR Heaven: Karudea no Akuma
Mahjong Fight Club DS
MAR Heaven: Marchen Awakens Romance Boukyaku no Kuravia
Power Pro Kun Pocket 9
2007
Yu-Gi-Oh! Duel Monsters: WORLD CHAMPIONSHIP 2007 (Japan) / Yu-Gi-Oh! World Championship 2007 (North America & Europe)
Death Note
Lunar Knights
Lost in Blue 2
Konami Classics Series: Arcade Hits
Winning Eleven: Pro Evolution Soccer 2007
Steel Horizon
Time Ace
Death, Jr. and the Science Fair of Doom
Dokodemo Yoga
GoPets: Vacation Island
Marvel Trading Card Game
Nova Usagi no Game de Ryuugaku!? DS
Otona Ryoku Kentei
Otona no Onnaryoku Kentei
Tokimeki Memorial Girl's Side 1st Love
Contra 4
Power Pro Kun Pocket 10
2008
New International Track & Field
Quiz Magic Academy DS
Zettai Karen Children: Dai 4 no Children
Time Hollow
Yu-Gi-Oh! Duel Monsters: WORLD CHAMPIONSHIP 2008 (Japan) / Yu-Gi-Oh! World Championship 2007 (North America & Europe)
Castlevania: Order of Ecclesia
Power Pro Kun Pocket 11
Winx Club: Mission Enchantix
2009
Elebits: The Adventures of Kai and Zero
Lost in Blue 3
Suikoden Tierkreis
Magician's Quest: Mysterious Times
Yu-Gi-Oh! 5D's Stardust Accelerator: WORLD CHAMPIONSHIP 2009
WireWay
Prince of Tennis: Doubles no Oujisama - Girls, be gracious!
Prince of Tennis: Doubles no Oujisama - Boys, be glorious!
Power Pro Kun Pocket 12
Love Plus
2010
Quiz Magic Academy DS Futatsu no Jikūseki
Utacchi
Yu-Gi-Oh! 5D's WORLD CHAMPIONSHIP 2010: Reverse of Arcadia
Tongari Boushi to Mahou no Omise
Captain Tsubasa: Gekito no Kiseki
Keshisasu-Kun: Battle Kas-tival
Power Pro Kun Pocket 13
Gormiti: The Lords Of Nature!
2011
Flash Puzzle: Maxwell's Mysterious Note
Power Pro Kun Pocket 14
Powerful Golf
Tongari Boushi to Oshare na Mahou Tsukai
Yu-Gi-Oh! 5D's WORLD CHAMPIONSHIP 2011: Over the Nexus
Super Scribblenauts

PlayStation handhelds

Mobile Phones
 200?
Antarctic Adventure (2001?)
Pooyan (2001?)
Shiori Jan
 2000
The Pirate Mileage
 
 2001
Bishi Bashi Champ
Twinbee
Puzzle-Dama
 2002
Ganbare Goemon: Tsūkai Game Apli
 
Tank Battle X
Riddle Rally
Pastel Jan
 
Konami No Burokkukuzushi Nazo No Kabe
 
 
 2003
Parodius Da! －Shinwa kara Owarai e－
Knightmare
 
Quarth
Gradius
Contra 
Time Pilot
Salamander
Puzzle-Dama DX
DX Hanafuda
 2004
Tokimeki Memorial
Detana! Twinbee
TwinBee Dungeon
Gradius NEO
Gradius NEO -IMPERIAL-
Tokimeki Memorial Girl's Side Puzzle-Dama
Metal Gear
Solid Snake
Castlevania
Silent Scope
Track and Field
Penta no Tsuri Bōken DX
Gyruss
Kawaī Jan
Bakudan Ribāshi
Bakudan Shinkei Suijaku
Bakudan Go Mo Kunara Be
 
 2005
Ganbare Goemon 3: Shichijuurokubei no Karakuri Manji Gatame
Ganbare Goemon! Karakuri Dōchū
Dance Dance Revolution Mobile 3D
Quiz Konamillion
Gradius II
Road Fighter
Dancing Stage
Quiz Magic Academy Mobile
 2006
Frogger for Prizes
Konami Wai Wai World
Akumajō Special: Boku Dracula-kun
Bio Miracle Bokutte Upa
Gradius 2
Konami Wai Wai Sokoban
Space Manbow
Parodius
Rumble Roses Sexy Pinball
New Track and Field
Penguin Adventure
Frogger 25th, Frogger Evolution
Castlevania III: Dracula's Curse
Dance Dance Revolution
Rush'n Attack
Ai Senshi Nicol
 2007
Ganbare Goemon Gaiden: Kieta Ougon Kiseru
Gokujō Parodius! ～Kako no Eikō o Motomete～
Frogger Launch
Pirate Poppers
Shout! Shaberin Champ Mobile
Quiz Magic Academy Mobile 2
Silent Hill: Orphan
Castlevania: Order of Shadows
Tokimeki Memorial OnlyLove ~ Tokimeki no Partner ~
Intuition! Bishi Bashi Champ Mobile
Tokimeki Memorial 2
Contra 4
Airforce Delta Alternative
Hell Girl Puzzle-Dama
Professor Fizzwizzle
Esper Dream
 2008
Pro Evolution Soccer 2008
Suikoden
Konami Comic: Genso Suikoden
Metal Gear Acid Mobile
Metal Gear Solid Mobile
Tokimeki Memorial Girl's Side -Love Stories-
Tomenasanna The pure Showa volume
Frogger Beats n' Bounces
Silent Hill Orphan 2
Dewy's Adventure
Quiz Magic Academy Mobile 3
Tokimeki Memorial Mail Drama
Konami Comic: Genso Suikoden II
Castlevania: Aria of Sorrow
Yie Ar Kung-Fu
Suikoden Tierkreis Stardust Castle
Super Contra
Pro Evolution Soccer 2009
LOST in BLUE Mobile Marina ＆ Riku Volume
GTI Club: Supermini Festa!
Power Pro World Home Run Competition 4
 2009
Suikoden II
Pro Evolution Soccer 2010
Metal Gear Acid 2 Mobile
Tomenasanna PJ Emperor Strikes Back
Tomenasanna UrbanCrisis
The Bishi Bashi! e-AMUSEMENT
Tokimeki Memorial Girl's Side 2nd Season Short Stories
Hayate no Gotoku!! Puzzle-Dama
iW Toki Memo
Logic Puzzle DX
Power Pro World University Baseball Success Volume
Power Pro World High School Baseball Success Volume
Power Pro World Shakaijin Yakyū Success Volume
Konami Comic: Genso Suikoden Tierkreis
Tokimeki Memorial Girl's Side 2nd Season: Novell Communications
Jackal
Power Pro World Mobile – Powerful Pro Baseball MEGA-X
Power Pro World Mobile Powerful Pro Baseball 6
Gorufure!
DX toranpu 6in
Kuizu Gakumon Nosusume
Puchitto Meitantei
 2010
Road Fighters
Gradius Arc -Legend of Silver Wing-
Tokimeki Memorial 4 Chu!
Millionaire Handy
Suikoden Card Collection
Tokimeki Memorial Girl's Side Mobile
Tokimeki Memorial 4: Communication Comic
DanceDanceRevolution X2
Silent Hill Mobile 3
Otegaru FreeCell
Power Pro World Fierce Fighting High School Baseball Success Volume
Quiz Magic Academy Mobile 4
 2011
Pop'n music M
Social Appli Surotore! KPE for GREE
Social Appli Power Pro home run competition for GREE
Magic Academy Puzzle-Dama
 2013
Pro Evolution Soccer Club Manager
 2018
Pro Evolution Soccer 2019
2019
Pro Evolution Soccer 2020

I-revo
 200?
Cosmic Wars
Getsu Fūma Den
 2006
Stinger
TwinBee 3

Plug and Play
Konami Live! Controller – Arcade
Konami Live! Controller – Frogger
 2001
Dance Dance Revolution Family Mat (Japan)
My First Dance Dance Revolution (Japan)
 2006
Dance Dance Revolution Strawberry Shortcake (North America)
Dance Dance Revolution Disney Mix (North America)
My First Dance Dance Revolution (North America)

Handheld Electronic Games
 19??
Beatmania
Guitar Freaks
Star Trek
Top Gun: Second Mission
Track & Field: Throwing type (by Bandai)
Tutankham
 1982
Guttang Gottong (by Mattel)
 1984
Track & Field: Running type (by Bandai)
 1988
The Lone Ranger
 1989
The Adventures of Bayou Billy
Contra
Double Dribble
Gradius
Teenage Mutant Ninja Turtles
Bill Elliot's NASCAR Racing
Blades of Steel
Bottom of the Ninth
Bull's Eye Barbecue Sauce
NFL Football
Skate or Die
Top Gun
 1990
Teenage Mutant Ninja Turtles II Splinter Speaks
Ganbare Goemon: Ebisumaru Kiki Ippatsu
Antarctic Adventure (usually listed as South Pole)
 1991
Bucky O'Hare
Garfield
Teenage Mutant Ninja Turtles 3 Shredder's Last Stand
Teenage Mutant Ninja Turtles Basketball
 1992
Asterix
Major League Baseball
Star Trek 25th Anniversary
Teenage Mutant Ninja Turtles Four for Four
Top Gun: Airstrike 3
 1998
Castlevania Symphony of the Night (by Tiger)
Dungeon Quest

Redemption Games
Piccadilly Circus
Piccadilly Gradius
Piccadilly Circus: Super Mario Bros. 3
Piccadilly Circus: Super Mario World
Piccadilly Circus: Konami Wai Wai World
Silent Scope Token Shot

Others
Funky Monkey
Little Pirates
Gokuraku Parodius

References

 Konami's list of Games (Japanese - old)
 Konami's list of Games (English - old)
 IGN's Konami page
 GameFAQs' Konami page
 System16's Konami Arcade page
 Konami Handheld Games at Handheld Museum
 Handheld Empire

 
 
Konami